= U-1 (semi-trailer) =

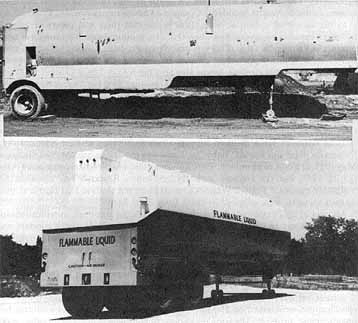
U-1 (above) and U-2, the first trailers used for transporting liquid hydrogen for aeronautics research

The U-1 was a 1950s liquid hydrogen trailer designed to carry cryogenic liquid hydrogen (LH_{2}) on roads being pulled by a powered vehicle. It was designed by Cambridge Corporation for a secret United States government program. The trailer had a vacuum-insulated tank that carried liquid hydrogen at extremely low temperatures (around −253 °C).

== History ==
The U-1 liquid hydrogen trailer was designed in response to requirements of the secret United States government program code-named Suntan, which aimed to develop a high speed, high altitude hydrogen-powered military aircraft for the United States Air Force. The trailer was designed and built by the Cambridge Corporation with the delivery coordinated through Wright Field in Ohio.

== Design ==
The U-1 trailer consisted of a vacuum-insulated, double-walled tank designed to maintain the liquid hydrogen at extremely low temperatures of about −253 °C (−423.4 °F). It had a storage capacity of approximately 26,500 L (5,800 imp gal; 7,000 US gal) of liquid hydrogen. As liquid hydrogen has a very low density (around 70 kg/m³), the mass of the entire payload was relatively small compared to its large volume. This low weight made it feasible for the trailer to be designed with a single axle, despite the larger size of the tanker.

During storage, the trailer experienced about two percent of content loss per day due to the evaporation of liquid hydrogen (hydrogen boil-off) due to heat, despite being maintained at low temperatures. This required the cryogenic hydrogen systems to have pressure-relief and venting mechanisms to safely expel the evaporated hydrogen gas.

== Operation and further development ==
Due to the secrecy of the project, the trailers were labeled simply as "flammable liquid" rather than being identified as liquid hydrogen. The drivers of the trailers were required to stop frequently at intermediate weighing stations during transport for cargo inspections due to the secret nature of the project and to ensure the safety of the liquid hydrogen.

However, during road operations, the single-axle configuration of the trailer led to repeated confrontation with the local and highway authorities, who were unfamiliar with the nature of the project and the unique trailer design. This led to the development of the improved U-2 trailer, which adopted a multi-axle configuration. The U-1 still represented an early milestone in cryogenic engineering, as it demonstrated the successful transportation of liquid hydrogen over public roads, which was required for use in aerospace programmes.

== See also ==
- Hydrogen economy
- Hydrogen infrastructure
- Timeline of hydrogen technologies
