= Cryo-adsorption =

Method used for hydrogen storage

Cryo-adsorption is a method used for hydrogen storage where gaseous hydrogen at cryogenic temperatures (150—60 K) is physically adsorbed on porous material, mostly activated carbon. The achievable storage density is between liquid-hydrogen (LH_{2}) storage systems and compressed-hydrogen (CGH_{2}) storage systems.

== See also ==
- Hydrogen tank
- Hydrogen economy
