= Liquid-hydrogen tanktainer =

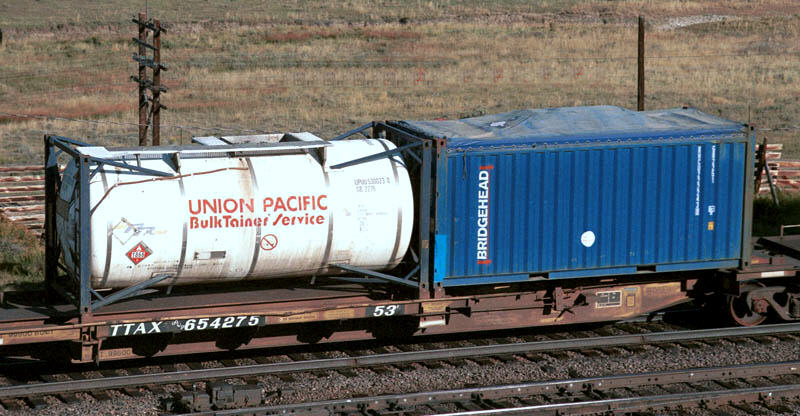
A Union Pacific Railroad 20 ft tank container and a 20 ft open-top container with canvas cover aboard a spine car

A liquid hydrogen tank-tainer, also known as a liquid hydrogen tank container, is a specialized type of container designed to carry cryogenic liquid hydrogen (LH_{2}) on standard intermodal equipment. The tank is held within a box-shaped frame the same size and shape as a container.

== Size and volume ==
Liquid hydrogen tanktainers are referenced by their size or volume capacity, generally an ISO 40 ft (12.19 m) container.

== See also ==
- Compressed hydrogen tube trailer
- Containerization
- Hydrogen economy
- Hydrogen infrastructure
- Liquid hydrogen tank car
- Liquid hydrogen trailer
- Tank chassis
- Tank container
