= Liquid-hydrogen tank car =

Railroad vehicle for transporting cryogenic material

A liquid hydrogen tank car, also called liquid hydrogen tank wagon or liquid hydrogen tanker wagon, is a railroad tank car designed to carry cryogenic liquid hydrogen (LH_{2}). LH_{2} tank cars with a capacity of 17,000 pounds (7,711 kg) are used for transcontinental transport.

== Design ==
The pressure within the tank is 25 psi (170 kPa) or lower with a temperature below 20.27 K (−423.17 °F or −252.87 °C) and a boil-off rate of 0.3% to 0.6% per day The tank is double walled like a vacuum flask with multi-layer insulation, with the valves and fittings enclosed in a cabinet at the lower side or end of the car.

== Classes ==
Cryogenic liquid tank cars in the US are classified as follows:

- DOT-113 tank cars (Cryogenic liquid tank cars)
- AAR-204W tank cars (Cryogenic liquid tank cars)
- AAR-204XT (Inside boxcar)

== See also ==
- Association of American Railroads – Industry trade group representing major North American freight railroads (AAR)
- Compressed-hydrogen tube trailer – Semi-trailers that consist of clusters of high-pressure hydrogen storage tubes
- Hydra (Starlight Express – 1984 musical by Andrew Lloyd Webber character)
- Hydrogen economy – Using hydrogen to decarbonize more sectors
- Hydrogen infrastructure – Infrastructure for hydrogen transport and distribution
- Liquid hydrogen tanktainer
- Liquid hydrogen trailer
- United States Department of Transportation – Federal executive department (DOT)
- Vacuum flask – Double-walled insulated storage vessel
- Vapor-cooled neck – Double-walled insulated storage vessel
- Vapor-cooled radiation shield – Double-walled insulated storage vessel
