= Liquid-hydrogen trailer =

A liquid-hydrogen trailer is a trailer designed to carry cryogenic liquid hydrogen (LH_{2}) on roads being pulled by a powered vehicle. The largest such vehicles are similar to railroad tanktainers which are also designed to carry liquefied loads. Liquid-hydrogen trailers tend to be large; they are insulated. Some are semi-trailers.

== History ==
The U-1 semi-trailer was a liquid-hydrogen trailer designed in the 1950s to carry cryogenic liquid hydrogen (LH_{2}) on roads being pulled by a powered vehicle. It was constructed by the Cambridge Corporation and had a capacity of 26,000 liters (6,900 U.S. gal; 5,700 imp gal) with a hydrogen loss rate of approximately 2 percent per day. The U-1 was a single-axle semi-trailer. The specifications for its successor the U-2, a double axle semi-trailer, were issued on 15 March 1957.

== Size and volume ==
Liquid hydrogen trailers are referenced by their size or volume capacity. Liquid-hydrogen trailers typically have capacities ranging from 28,400 to 49,200 liters (7,502 to 12,997 U.S. gal; 6,247 to 10,822 imp gal) gross volume.

== See also ==
- Compressed-hydrogen tube trailer
- Hydrogen economy
- Hydrogen infrastructure
- Liquid-hydrogen tank car
- Liquid-hydrogen tanktainer
- Trailer (vehicle)
