= California Hydrogen Highway =

Series of hydrogen refueling stations in California

The California Hydrogen Highway is a series of hydrogen refueling stations in California. These stations are used to refuel hydrogen vehicles. As of November 2026, there were 37 publicly accessible hydrogen refueling stations in California.

== History ==
The California Hydrogen Highway Network (CaH2Net) was initiated in April 2004 by Executive Order (EO) S-07-04 under Governor Arnold Schwarzenegger with the purpose of promoting hydrogen refueling stations in California. Other initiatives followed in California.

As of 2007, 25 stations were in operation. Some of these hydrogen fueling stations completed the terms of their government-funded research demonstration project and were decommissioned. In 2012, there were 23 hydrogen fueling stations in California, eight of which were publicly accessible. In 2013 Governor Brown signed AB 8, a bill to fund $20 million a year for up to 100 stations.

As of July 2025, there were 50 publicly accessible hydrogen fueling stations in California (one station in Hawaii and one in Washington were the only other publicly accessible hydrogen stations in the US). The number of publicly accessible stations decreased to 37 by 2026, as hydrogen-powered cars failed to achieve popularity, and by 2020, all but three automobile companies had abandoned plans to manufacture hydrogen cars. A significant number of the public hydrogen fuel stations in California are not able to dispense hydrogen.

== See also ==
- Hydrogen infrastructure
- Hydrogen economy
