= Solid hydrogen =

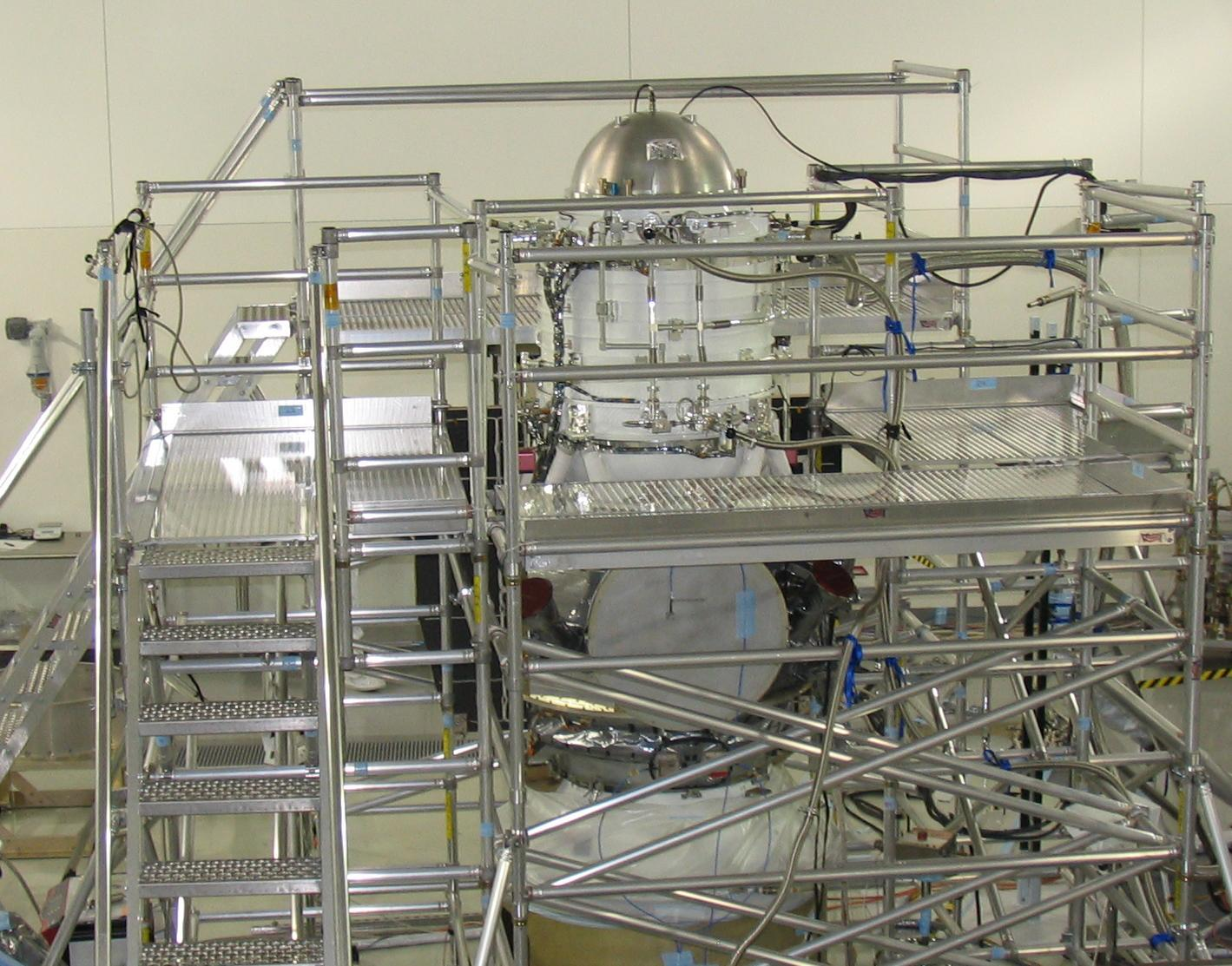
The infrared instrument on NASA's Wide-field Infrared Survey Explorer is kept extremely cold by a spherical tank of frozen hydrogen called the cryostat. During assembly, scaffolding was built around the cryostat to give engineers full access to the spacecraft.

Solid hydrogen is the solid state of the element hydrogen. At standard pressure, this is achieved by decreasing the temperature below hydrogen's melting point of 14.01 K (−259.14 °C; −434.45 °F). It was collected for the first time by James Dewar in 1899 and published with the title "Sur la solidification de l'hydrogène" (English: On the freezing of hydrogen) in the Annales de Chimie et de Physique, 7th series, vol. 18, Oct. 1899. Solid hydrogen has a density of 0.086 g/cm^{3} making it one of the lowest-density solids.

== Molecular solid hydrogen ==
At low temperatures and at pressures up to around 400 GPa (3,900,000 atm), hydrogen forms a series of solid phases formed from discrete H_{2} molecules. Phase I occurs at low temperatures and pressures, and consists of a hexagonal close-packed array of freely rotating H_{2} molecules. Upon increasing the pressure at low temperature, a transition to Phase II occurs at up to 110 GPa. Phase II is a broken-symmetry structure in which the H_{2} molecules are no longer able to rotate freely. If the pressure is further increased at low temperature, a Phase III is encountered at about 160 GPa. Upon increasing the temperature, a transition to a Phase IV occurs at a temperature of a few hundred kelvin at a range of pressures above 220 GPa.

Identifying the atomic structures of the different phases of molecular solid hydrogen is extremely challenging, because hydrogen atoms interact with X-rays very weakly and only small samples of solid hydrogen can be achieved in diamond anvil cells, so that X-ray diffraction provides very limited information about the structures. Nevertheless, phase transitions can be detected by looking for abrupt changes in the Raman spectra of samples. Furthermore, atomic structures can be inferred from a combination of experimental Raman spectra and first-principles modelling. Density functional theory calculations have been used to search for candidate atomic structures for each phase. These candidate structures have low free energies and Raman spectra in agreement with the experimental spectra. Quantum Monte Carlo methods together with a first-principles treatment of anharmonic vibrational effects have then been used to obtain the relative Gibbs free energies of these structures and hence to obtain a theoretical pressure-temperature phase diagram that is in reasonable quantitative agreement with experiment. On this basis, Phase II is believed to be a molecular structure of P2_{1}/c symmetry; Phase III is (or is similar to) a structure of C2/c symmetry consisting of flat layers of molecules in a distorted hexagonal arrangement; and Phase IV is (or is similar to) a structure of Pc symmetry, consisting of alternate layers of strongly bonded molecules and weakly bonded graphene-like sheets.

== See also ==
- Compressed hydrogen
- Liquid hydrogen
- Metallic hydrogen
- Slush hydrogen
- Timeline of hydrogen technologies
