= Hydrogen highway (Japan) =

Japan's hydrogen highway is a network of hydrogen filling stations placed along roadsides that provide fuel for hydrogen fuel cell vehicles (HFCV). An HFCV is a vehicle that uses a fuel cell to convert hydrogen energy into electrical energy. The hydrogen that is used in fuel cell vehicles can be made using fossil or renewable resources. The hydrogen highway is necessary for HFCVs to be used. HFCV reduce tailpipe emissions of greenhouse gases. As of 2025, there are approximately 149 hydrogen refuelling stations.

== Japanese hydrogen powered cars ==
Since 2014, Toyota and Honda have begun to introduce Fuel Cell Vehicles (FCV) that convert hydrogen into electricity while only emitting water vapor at the tailpipe. Fuel cell vehicle (FCV) adoption is limited by the lack of a widespread hydrogen supply infrastructure, which is essential to increase the practicality and appeal of hydrogen-powered vehicles for consumers.

Hyundai re-entered the Japanese market and unveiled an all-new Nexo FCEV at the Japan Mobility Show 2025. Toyota also introduced a Crown FCEV variant in late 2023/2024. There is a significant strategic shift toward commercial fuel cell vehicles (trucks and buses) rather than just passenger cars to drive consistent hydrogen demand.

== Development ==
The first two hydrogen fueling stations were built for the Japan Hydrogen and Fuel Cell Demonstration Project (JHFC) Expo, to promote the usage of hydrogen fuel, in March 2005. The fuel stations were displayed in two different sides in the city of Seto (Seto-North and Seto-South). This Expo for introducing hydrogen fuel cell technology proved effective as over 1,300 kg of fuel was dispensed from the stations. At the end of 2012 there were 17 hydrogen stations.

The Japanese government planned to add up to 100 public hydrogen stations under a budget of 460 million dollars covering 50% of the installation costs with the last ones hoped to be operational in 2015. JX Energy expected to install 40 stations by 2015. Toho Gas and Iwatani Corp expected to install an additional 20 stations. Toyota Tsusho and Air Liquide made a JV to build 2 hydrogen stations hoped to be ready by 2015. A "task force" led by Yuriko Koike, Japan's former environment minister, and supported by the country's Liberal Democratic Party was set up to guide the process.

By May 2016, there were approximately 80 hydrogen fueling stations in Japan, and as of 2024 there are at least 157, with 7 more in development. However, in 2025, the number of operational hydrogen stations dropped to 149, a 5.09% decrease compared to 2024.

== Reasons for Japan's investment in fuel cells ==
The two motivations for the research and development of fuel cells were because of the energy policy and the industrial policy. Japan's energy policy promotes finding and creating new sources of renewable energy and staying technologically competitive with other countries and companies. Japan's industrial policy promotes maintaining a competitive economy through advanced technology.

The Basic Hydrogen Strategy was majorly revised in June 2023, with a new target to increase the annual hydrogen supply to 12 million tons by 2040 and 20 million tons by 2050. The Hydrogen Society Promotion Act was also enacted in May 2024 to provide subsidies for low-carbon hydrogen.

== Creators of the JHFC ==
The members from the government branch are: Ministry of Economy, Trade and Industry; Agency of Natural Resources and Energy; and Ministry of Land, Infrastructure and Transport (MLIT).
Member from a semi-governmental organization: New Energy and Industrial Technology Development Organization.
Member of Public Research: National Institute of Advanced Industrial Science and Technology.
Member of Private Firm: Fuel Cell Commercialization Conference of Japan.

== Supporters ==
The cost of these Hydrogen gas stations is not cheap so there are many car and oil companies that are supporting this transition. There are 13 main companies that are paying for the new source of fuel.

- Toyota Motor Corporation (TMC)
- Nissan Motor Company
- Honda Motor Company
- JX Nippon Oil & Energy Corporation
- Idemitsu Kosan Company
- Iwatani Corporation
- Osaka Gas Company
- Cosmo Oil Company
- Saibu Gas Company
- Showa Shell Sekiyu K.K.
- Taiyo Nippon Sanso Corporation
- Tokyo Gas Company
- Toho Gas Company
