= Slush hydrogen =

Combination of liquid hydrogen and solid hydrogen

Slush hydrogen is a combination of liquid hydrogen and solid hydrogen at the triple point with a lower temperature and a higher density than liquid hydrogen. It is commonly formed by repeating a freeze-thaw process. This is most easily done by bringing liquid hydrogen near its boiling point and then reducing pressure using a vacuum pump. The decrease in pressure causes the liquid hydrogen to vaporize/boil - which removes latent heat, and ultimately decreases the temperature of the liquid hydrogen. Solid hydrogen is formed on the surface of the boiling liquid (between the gas/liquid interface) as the liquid is cooled and reaches its triple point. The vacuum pump is stopped, causing an increase of pressure, the solid hydrogen formed on the surface partially melts and begins to sink. The solid hydrogen is agitated in the liquid and the process is repeated. The resulting hydrogen slush has an increased density of 16–20% when compared to liquid hydrogen. It is proposed as a rocket fuel in place of liquid hydrogen in order to use smaller fuel tanks and thus reduce the dry weight of the vehicle.

== Production ==
The continuous freeze technique used for slush hydrogen involves pulling a continuous vacuum over triple point liquid and using a solid hydrogen mechanical ice-breaker to disrupt the surface of the freezing hydrogen.

- Fuel density: 0.085 g/cm^{3}
- Melting point: −259 °C
- Boiling point: −253 °C

== See also ==
- Compressed hydrogen
- Hydrogen safety
- Metallic hydrogen
- Timeline of hydrogen technologies
- Liquefaction of gases
