= Compressed-hydrogen tube trailer =

Semi-trailers that consist of clusters of high-pressure hydrogen storage tubes

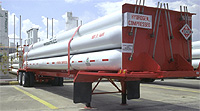
Compressed hydrogen tube trailer

Hydrogen tube trailers are semi-trailers that consist of 4 to 36 cluster high-pressure hydrogen tanks varying in length from 20 feet (6.10 m) for small tubes to 53 feet (16.15 m) on jumbo tube trailers. They are part of the hydrogen highway and usually precede a local hydrogen station.

== Types ==
=== Modular tube trailer ===
Older tube trailers made of steel (Type I) usually carry about 100 kg (220 lb) per load, while new and more efficient composite trailers (Type IV) made of carbon fiber make it possible to carry up to 1 tonne (1.1 short tons; 0.98 long tons) per load. Modular tube trailers range from 8 to 54 tubes.

=== Intermediate trailer ===
Intermediate tubes are assembled in banks of 5 tubes in lengths of 19 and 38 ft (5.8 and 11.6 m) and provide mobile or stationary storage.

=== Jumbo tube trailer ===
A trailer with 10 tubes and a 44-foot (13.41 m) chassis, operating with pressures in excess of 3,200 psi (220.6 bar; 22.1 MPa).

=== Composite tube trailers ===
As of 2012, the US Department of Transportation (DOT) started to award Special Permits (SP) to different manufactures to produce Type IV Hydrogen trailers in the US. The US is the current leader in Composite tank manufacturing.

As in July 2016, Nishal Group has multiple cascade configurations in the form of cascade banks operating at 200 bar (20,000 kPa; 2,900 psi).

In February 2018, CATEC Gases was awarded DOT certification to produce a 1,000 kg (2,200 lb), 53 ft (16.2 m) hydrogen tube trailer operating at 275 bar (27,500 kPa; 3,990 psi).

== See also ==
- Hydrogen economy
- Hydrogen infrastructure
- Liquid hydrogen tank car
- Liquid hydrogen tanktainer
- Liquid hydrogen trailer
