= Toho Gas =

Toho Gas Co., Ltd.
- Toho Gas Company logo
- Trade name: 東邦ガス
- Native name: 東邦瓦斯株式会社
- Romanized name: Tōhō Gasu Kabushiki-gaisha
- Type: Public (K.K.)
- Traded as: TYO: 9533
- Industry: Energy
- Founded: June 26, 1922
- Headquarters: Atsuta-ku, Nagoya, Japan
- Area served: Aichi, Gifu, Mie
- Services: Production, supply and sale of city gas Supply and sale of gas appliances, and related construction Construction for supply of city gas Energy services Supply of electricity
- Revenue: ▲¥461,199 million (FY 2018, consolidated)
- Operating income: ▼¥17,831 million (FY 2018, consolidated)
- Net income: ▼¥21,485 million (FY 2018, consolidated)
- Total assets: ▲¥550,599 million (FY 2018, consolidated)
- Total equity: ▲¥327,339 million (FY 2018, consolidated)
- Number of employees: 2,858 (2018)
- Website: www.tohogas.co.jp/lang-n/en/corporate/

Toho Gas Co., Ltd. (東邦瓦斯株式会社, Tōhō Gasu Kabushiki-gaisha), commonly written as 東邦ガス, is a Japanese gas company based in Nagoya, Japan. It supplies gas to the Tōkai region, especially the Chūkyō metropolitan area. It is also one of Nagoya's "four influential companies" along with Meitetsu, Matsuzakaya, and Chubu Electric Power.

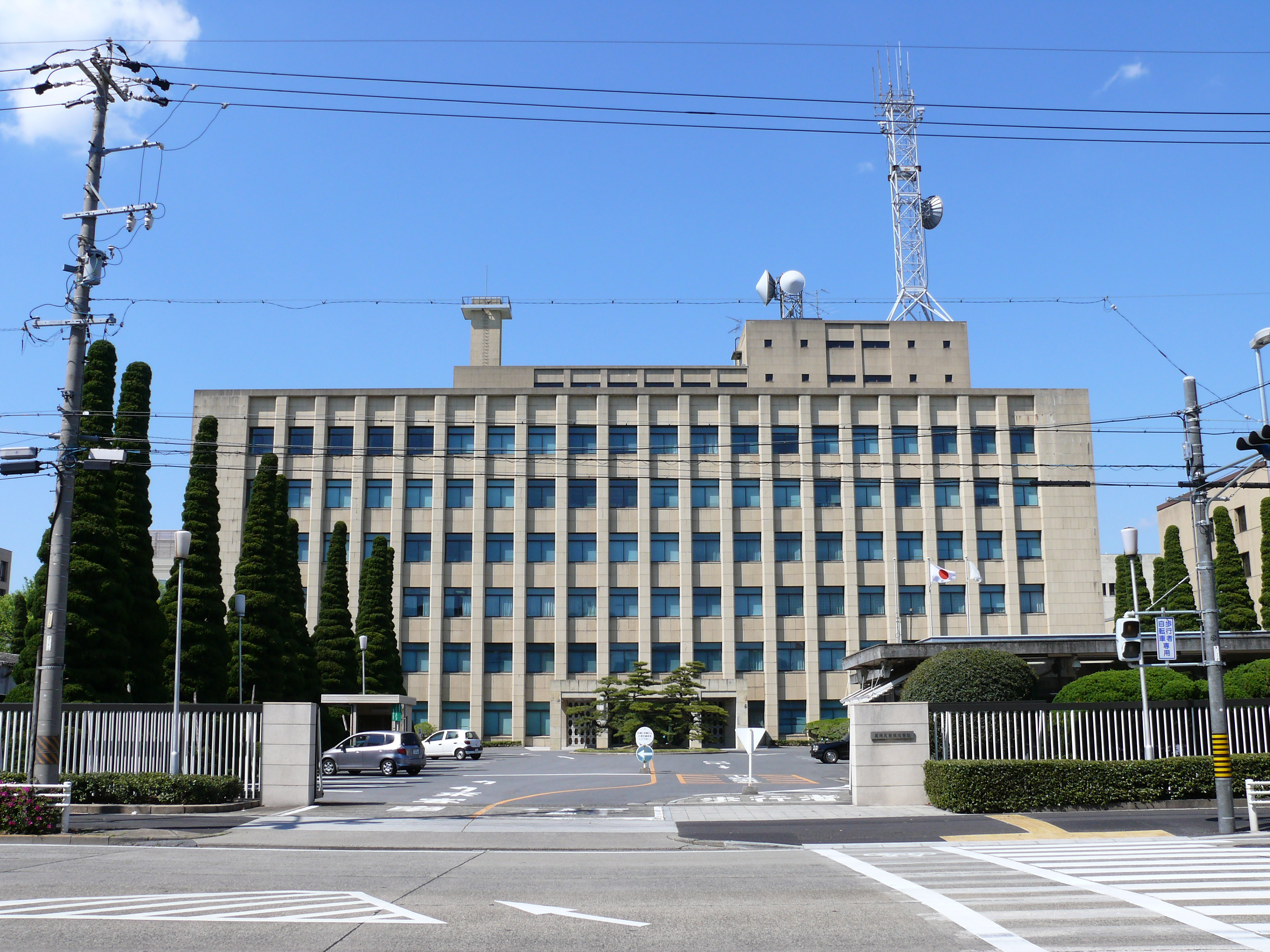
Toho Gas Building 19–18, Sakurada-cho, Atsuta-ku, Nagoya, Japan

== History ==
Toho Gas was initially founded to the Toho Electric Power Company (東邦電力) in 1922, as a result of the merger of two electric power companies, Kansai Denki and Kyushu Dentō Tetsudō. Following the merger, the company decided to spin off the gas business and acquisition of the Nagoya Gas Corporation.

=== Timeline ===
- June 26, 1922, Toho Gas was founded by acquiring business of Nagoya Gas.
- March 1927, Toho Gas acquired business of Saibu Gas Group in Fukuoka.
- December 1930, The gas business in the Northern Kyushu region was transferred to Saibu Gas Corporation.
- April 2003, Toho Gas merged with Gōdō Gas, Gifu Gas Corporation, and Ōgaki Gas.

== Affiliates ==
- Toho Gas Customer Service Company Limited
- Mizushima Gas Company Limited in Kurashiki, Okayama Prefecture
- Toho Gas Techno Company Limited
- Toho Liquefied Gas Company Limited
