= Compressed hydrogen =

Gaseous state of the element hydrogen kept under pressure

Compressed Hydrogen
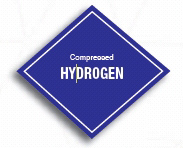

- IUPAC: Compressed hydrogen
- Other names: Hydrogen under pressure, CGH_{2}, CGH2
- UN number: 1049, Class 2
- IMO: 1049, Class 2.1
- DOT: 1049, Class 2.1
- ADR: 1049, Class 2.1
- IATA: 1049, Class 2.1
- WHMIS: A, B1
- RTECS: MW8900000
- PEL-OSHA: Simple asphyxiant
- ACGIH TLV-TWA: Simple asphyxiant
- Appearance: Colorless, odorless
- LEL: 4 %
- UEL: 75 %
- Auto ignition: 500 °C (932 °F)

Compressed hydrogen (CH_{2}, CGH_{2} or CGH2) is the gaseous state of the element hydrogen kept under pressure. Compressed hydrogen in hydrogen tanks at 350 bar (5,000 psi) and 700 bar (10,000 psi) is used for mobile hydrogen storage in hydrogen vehicles. It is used as a fuel gas.

== Infrastructure ==
Compressed hydrogen is used in hydrogen pipeline transport and in compressed hydrogen tube trailer transport.

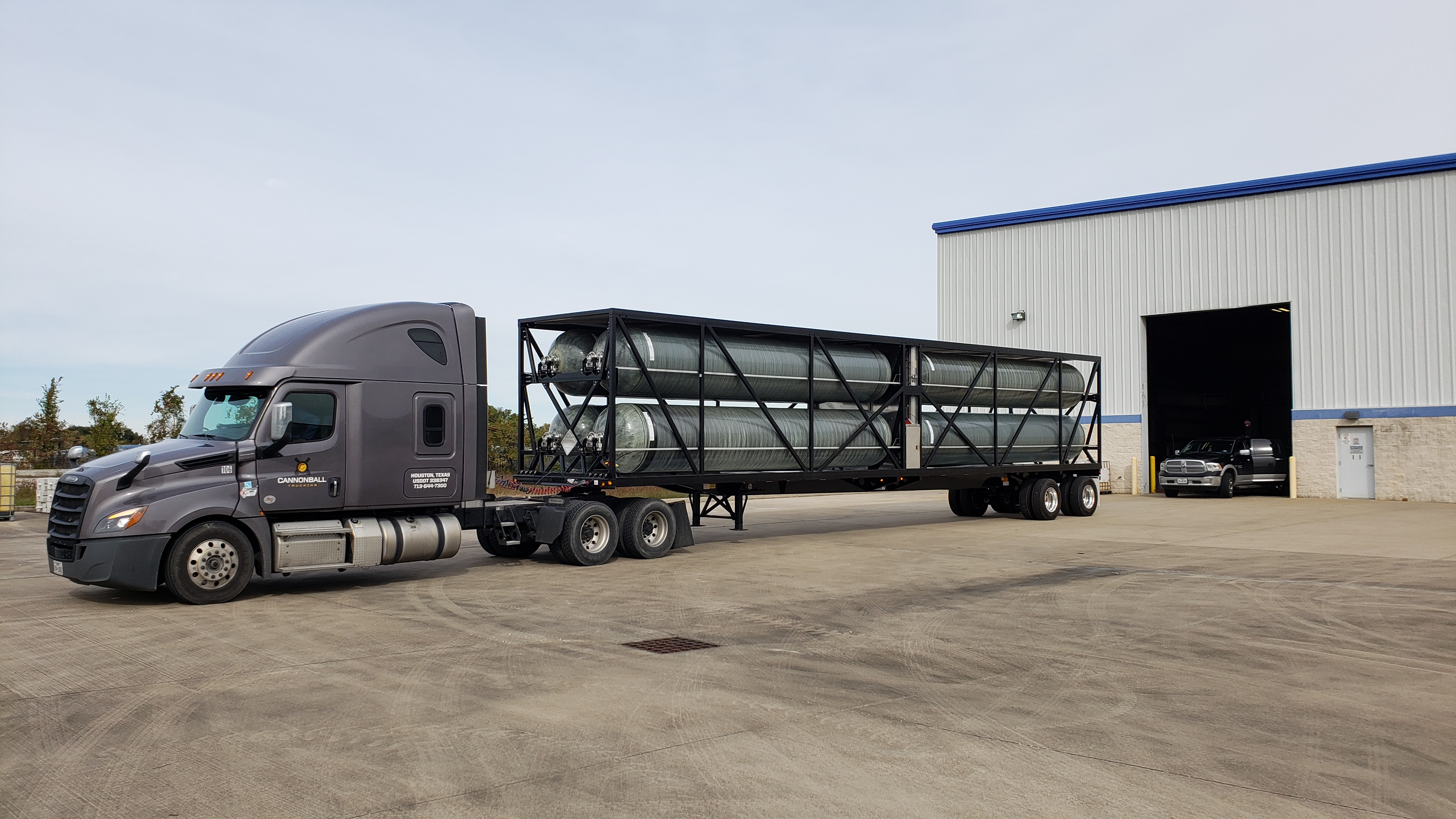
Hydrogen tube trailer

== See also ==
- Combined cycle powered railway locomotive
- Cryo-adsorption
- Gas compressor
- Gasoline gallon equivalent
- Hydrogen compressor
- Hydrogen safety
- Liquid hydrogen
- Liquefaction of gases
- Metallic hydrogen
- Slush hydrogen
- Standard cubic foot
- Timeline of hydrogen technologies
