= Hydrogen economy =

Using hydrogen to decarbonize more sectors

Hydrogen has the most potential to reduce greenhouse gas emissions when used in chemical production, refineries, international shipping, and steelmaking

The hydrogen economy is a term for the role hydrogen as an energy carrier to complement electricity as part of a long-term option to reduce emissions of greenhouse gases. The aim is to reduce emissions where cheaper and more energy-efficient clean solutions are not available. In this context, hydrogen economy encompasses the production of hydrogen and the use of hydrogen in ways that contribute to phasing-out fossil fuels and limiting climate change.

Hydrogen can be produced by several means. Most hydrogen produced today is gray hydrogen, made from natural gas through steam methane reforming (SMR). This process accounted for 1.8% of global greenhouse gas emissions in 2021. Low-carbon hydrogen, which is made using SMR with carbon capture and storage (blue hydrogen), or through electrolysis of water using renewable power (green hydrogen), accounted for less than 1% of production. Of the 100 million tonnes of hydrogen produced in 2021, 43% was used in oil refining and 57% in industry, principally in the manufacture of ammonia for fertilizers, and methanol.

To limit global warming, it is generally envisaged that the future hydrogen economy replace gray hydrogen with low-carbon hydrogen. As of 2024 it is unclear when enough low-carbon hydrogen could be produced to phase-out all the gray hydrogen. The future end-uses are likely in heavy industry (e.g. high-temperature processes alongside electricity, feedstock for production of green ammonia and organic chemicals, as alternative to coal-derived coke for steelmaking), long-haul transport (e.g. shipping, and to a lesser extent hydrogen-powered aircraft and heavy goods vehicles), and long-term energy storage. Other applications, such as light duty vehicles and heating in buildings, are no longer part of the future hydrogen economy, primarily for economic and environmental reasons. Hydrogen is challenging to store, to transport in pipelines, and to use. It presents safety concerns since it is highly explosive, and it is inefficient compared to direct use of electricity. Since relatively small amounts of low-carbon hydrogen are available, climate benefits can be maximized by using it in harder-to-decarbonize applications.

As of 2023 there are no real alternatives to hydrogen for several chemical processes in which it is currently used, such as ammonia production for fertilizer. The cost of low- and zero-carbon hydrogen is likely to influence the degree to which it will be used in chemical feedstocks, long haul aviation and shipping, and long-term energy storage. Production costs of low- and zero-carbon hydrogen are evolving. Future costs may be influenced by carbon taxes, the geography and geopolitics of energy, energy prices, technology choices, and their raw material requirements. The U.S. Department of Energy's Hydrogen Hotshot Initiative seeks to reduce the cost of green hydrogen drop to $1 a kilogram by 2031, though the cost of electrolyzers rose 50% between 2021 and 2024.

== History and objectives ==
=== Origins ===
The concept of a society that uses hydrogen as the primary means of energy storage was theorized by geneticist J. B. S. Haldane in 1923. Anticipating the exhaustion of Britain's coal reserves for power generation, Haldane proposed a network of wind turbines to produce hydrogen and oxygen for long-term energy storage through electrolysis, to help address renewable power's variable output. The term "hydrogen economy" itself was coined by John Bockris during a talk he gave in 1970 at General Motors (GM) Technical Center. Bockris viewed it as an economy in which hydrogen, underpinned by nuclear and solar power, would help address growing concern about fossil fuel depletion and environmental pollution, by serving as energy carrier for end-uses in which electrification was not suitable.

A hydrogen economy was proposed by the University of Michigan to solve some of the negative effects of using hydrocarbon fuels where the carbon is released to the atmosphere (as carbon dioxide, carbon monoxide, unburnt hydrocarbons, etc.). Modern interest in the hydrogen economy can generally be traced to a 1970 technical report by Lawrence W. Jones of the University of Michigan, in which he echoed Bockris' dual rationale of addressing energy security and environmental challenges. Unlike Haldane and Bockris, Jones only focused on nuclear power as the energy source for electrolysis, and principally on the use of hydrogen in transport, where he regarded aviation and heavy goods transport as the top priorities.

In 1974 International Energy Agency (IEA) and the International Association for Hydrogen Energy (IAHE) were established. These organizations had several initiatives including advocating for national strategies to increase interest and visibility of the hydrogen economy.

=== Later evolution ===
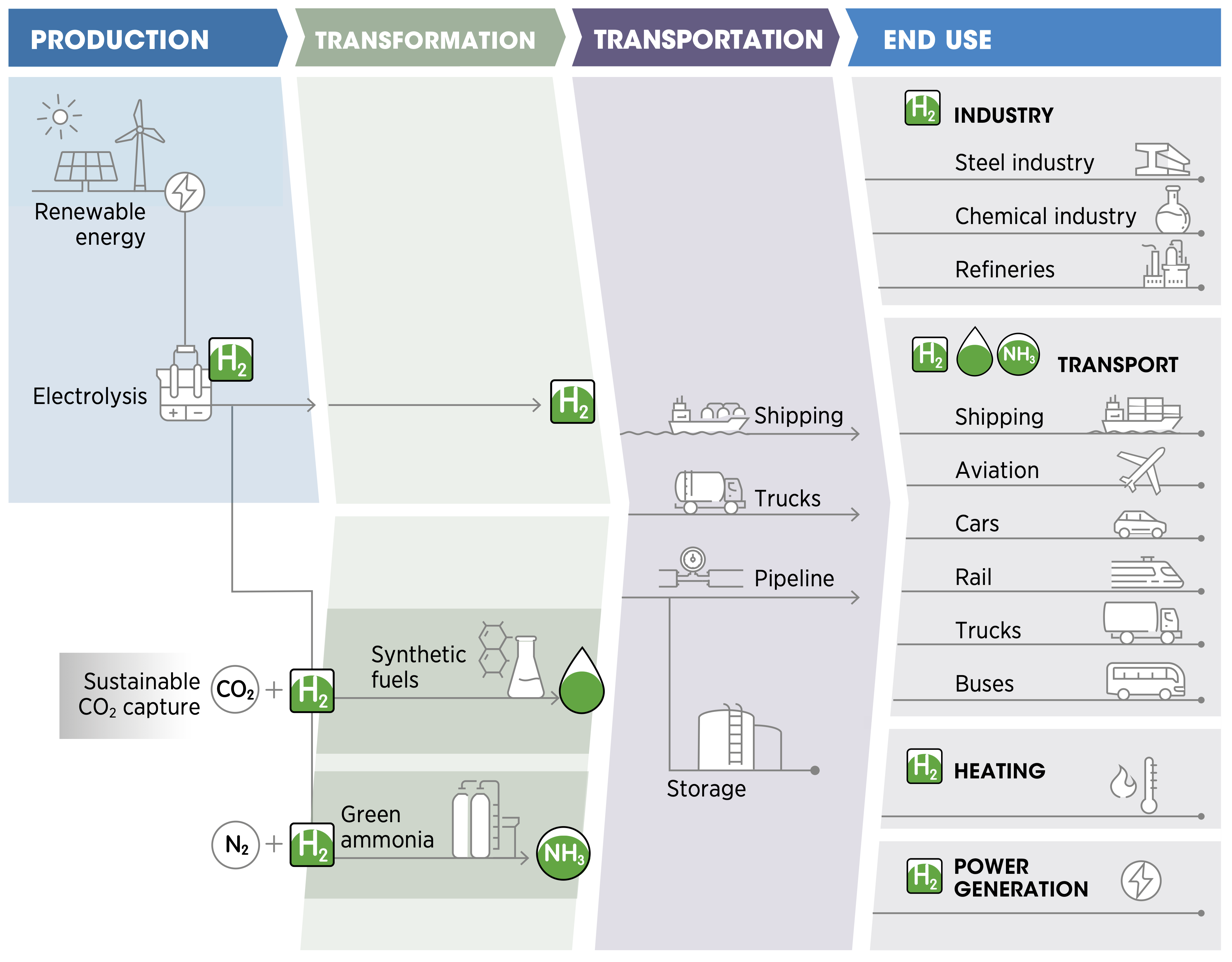
Technology leadership opportunities in green hydrogen value chains according to the International Renewable Energy Agency in 2022

A spike in attention for the hydrogen economy concept during the 2000s was repeatedly described as hype by some critics and proponents of alternative technologies, and investors lost money in the bubble. Interest in the energy carrier resurged in the 2010s, notably with the forming of the Hydrogen Council in 2017. Several manufacturers released hydrogen fuel cell cars commercially, and manufacturers such as Toyota, Hyundai, and industry groups in China planned to increase numbers of the cars into the hundreds of thousands over the next decade. However, the global scope for hydrogen's role in cars is shrinking relative to earlier expectations. By the end of 2022, 70,200 hydrogen vehicles had been sold worldwide, compared with 26 million plug-in electric vehicles.

Early 2020s takes on the hydrogen economy share earlier perspectives' emphasis on the complementarity of electricity and hydrogen, and the use of electrolysis as the mainstay of hydrogen production. They focus on the need to limit global warming to 1.5 °C and prioritize the production, transportation and use of green hydrogen for heavy industry (e.g. high-temperature processes alongside electricity, feedstock for production of green ammonia and organic chemicals, as alternative to coal-derived coke for steelmaking), long-haul transport (e.g. shipping, aviation and to a lesser extent heavy goods vehicles), and long-term energy storage.

=== National hydrogen strategies ===
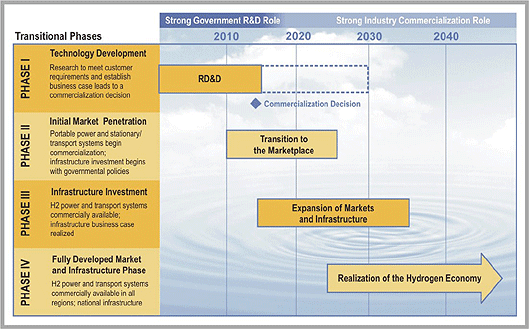
Hydrogen strategy phases

Since 2017, several countries and regions have released a hydrogen strategy, outlining their goals in developing hydrogen infrastructure and as a guide for private investment. The International Renewable Energy Agency has proposed national strategies as the first pillar of policies to promote green hydrogen.

In 2017 Japan published their strategy with a proposal to become the world's first "hydrogen society". Many provinces and cities in China have established hydrogen strategies. The European Union strategy, adopted in 2021, outlines a plan to develop large scale infrastructure for hydrogen including electrolysers in collaboration with multiple trade organizations. The US hydrogen strategy "presents a strategic framework for achieving large-scale production and use of hydrogen" over a 30 year period. Analysis suggests that even nations reliant on exports of natural gas like Qatar could benefit from hydrogen strategies that leverage existing infrastructure, expertise, and markets. As of 2021, 28 governments had published hydrogen strategies. By 2024, that number reached 60. However the actual strategies proposed are not necessarily based on climate friendly green hydrogen. The majority of the strategies have been characterized by scale first and clean later, meaning they add regulations to enhance the viability of green hydrogen but do not mandate it use. Economic analysis shows few national strategies can make their 2030 goals.

== Current hydrogen market ==
Hydrogen production globally was valued at over US$155 billion in 2022 and is expected to grow over 9% annually through 2030.

In 2021, 94 million tonnes (Mt) of molecular hydrogen (H_{2}) was produced. Of this total, approximately one sixth was as a by-product of petrochemical industry processes. Most hydrogen comes from dedicated production facilities, over 99% of which is from fossil fuels, mainly via steam reforming of natural gas (70%) and coal gasification (30%, almost all of which in China). Less than 1% of dedicated hydrogen production is low carbon: steam fossil fuel reforming with carbon capture and storage, green hydrogen produced using electrolysis, and hydrogen produced from biomass. CO_{2} emissions from 2021 production, at 915 MtCO_{2}, amounted to 2.5% of energy-related CO_{2} emissions and 1.8% of global greenhouse gas emissions.

Virtually all hydrogen produced for the current market is used in oil refining (40 MtH_{2} in 2021) and industry (54 MtH2). In oil refining, hydrogen is used, in a process known as hydrocracking, to convert heavy petroleum sources into lighter fractions suitable for use as fuels. Industrial uses mainly comprise ammonia production to make fertilizers (34 MtH_{2} in 2021), methanol production (15 MtH_{2}) and the manufacture of direct reduced iron (5 MtH_{2}).

== Production ==
Hydrogen gas is produced by several industrial methods. Nearly all of the world's current supply of hydrogen is created from fossil fuels. Most hydrogen is gray hydrogen made through steam methane reforming. In this process, hydrogen is produced from a chemical reaction between steam and methane, the main component of natural gas. Producing one tonne of hydrogen through this process emits 6.6–9.3 tonnes of carbon dioxide. When carbon capture and storage is used to remove a large fraction of these emissions, the product is known as blue hydrogen.

Green hydrogen is usually understood to be produced from renewable electricity via electrolysis of water. Less frequently, definitions of green hydrogen include hydrogen produced from other low-emission sources such as biomass. Producing green hydrogen is currently more expensive than producing gray hydrogen, and the efficiency of energy conversion is inherently low. Other methods of hydrogen production include biomass gasification, methane pyrolysis, extraction of underground natural hydrogen, and in situ hydrogen synthesis.

As of 2023, less than 1% of dedicated hydrogen production is low-carbon, i.e. blue hydrogen, green hydrogen, and hydrogen produced from biomass.

=== Green methanol ===
Green methanol is a liquid fuel that is produced from combining carbon dioxide and hydrogen (CO_{2} + 3 H_{2} → CH_{3}OH + H_{2}O) under pressure and heat with catalysts. It is a way to reuse carbon capture for recycling. Methanol can store hydrogen economically at standard outdoor temperatures and pressures, compared to liquid hydrogen and ammonia that need to use a lot of energy to stay cold in their liquid state. In 2023 the Laura Maersk was the first container ship to run on methanol fuel. Ethanol plants in the midwest are a good place for pure carbon capture to combine with hydrogen to make green methanol, with abundant wind and nuclear energy in Iowa, Minnesota, and Illinois. Mixing methanol with ethanol could make methanol a safer fuel to use because methanol doesn't have a visible flame in the daylight and doesn't emit smoke, and ethanol has a visible light yellow flame. Green hydrogen production of 70% efficiency and a 70% efficiency of methanol production from that would be a 49% energy conversion efficiency.

=== White Hydrogen ===
Natural hydrogen (also known as white hydrogen, geologic hydrogen, geogenic hydrogen, or gold hydrogen) is molecular hydrogen present on Earth that is formed by natural processes, as opposed to hydrogen produced in a laboratory or in industry. Modelling suggests that sufficient natural hydrogen exists to meet humanity's demand for thousands of years; however, most of it cannot be extracted economically. Natural hydrogen has been identified in many source rocks in areas beyond the sedimentary basins where oil companies typically operate. As of 2026, only one natural hydrogen well has been exploited, supplying gas to generate electricity for a village in Mali, but exploration and research projects are underway in many countries worldwide.

== Uses ==
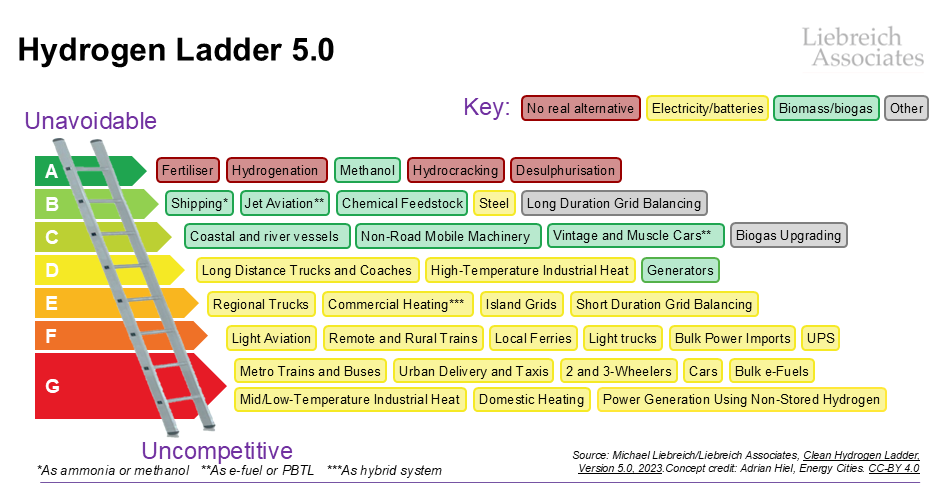
Hydrogen Ladder: Ranking of hydrogen applications and uses in the medium term, but analysts disagree

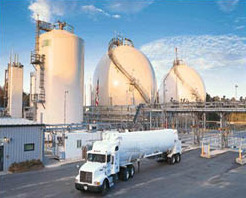
Hydrogen fuel requires the development of a specific infrastructure for processing, transport and storage.

Hydrogen can be deployed as a fuel in two distinct ways: in fuel cells which produce electricity, and via combustion to generate heat. When hydrogen is consumed in fuel cells, the only emission at the point of use is water vapor. Combustion of hydrogen can lead to the thermal formation of harmful nitrogen oxides emissions.

=== Industry ===
In the context of limiting global warming, low-carbon hydrogen (particularly green hydrogen) is likely to play an important role in decarbonizing industry. Hydrogen fuel can produce the intense heat required for industrial production of steel, cement, glass, and chemicals, thus contributing to the decarbonization of industry alongside other technologies, such as electric arc furnaces for steelmaking. However, it is likely to play a larger role in providing industrial feedstock for cleaner production of ammonia and organic chemicals. For example, in steelmaking, hydrogen could function as a clean energy carrier and also as a low-carbon catalyst replacing coal-derived coke.

The imperative to use low-carbon hydrogen to reduce greenhouse gas emissions has the potential to reshape the geography of industrial activities, as locations with appropriate hydrogen production potential in different regions will interact in new ways with logistics infrastructure, raw material availability, human and technological capital.

=== Transport ===
Much of the interest in the hydrogen economy concept is focused on hydrogen vehicles, primarily forklifts, airport service vehicles, public transportation busses, cars and trucks. Other applications are more speculative, including possible hydrogen planes. Hydrogen vehicles produce significantly less local air pollution than conventional vehicles. By 2050, the energy requirement for transportation might be between 20% and 30% fulfilled by hydrogen and synthetic fuels.

Hydrogen used to decarbonize transportation is likely to find its largest applications in shipping, aviation and to a lesser extent heavy goods vehicles, through the use of hydrogen-derived synthetic fuels such as ammonia and methanol, and fuel cell technology. Hydrogen has been used in fuel cell buses for many years. It is also used as a fuel for spacecraft propulsion.

In the International Energy Agency's 2022 Net Zero Emissions Scenario (NZE), hydrogen is forecast to account for 2% of rail energy demand in 2050, while 90% of rail travel is expected to be electrified by then (up from 45% today). Hydrogen's role in rail would likely be focused on lines that prove difficult or costly to electrify. The NZE foresees hydrogen meeting approximately 30% of heavy truck energy demand in 2050, mainly for long-distance heavy freight (with battery electric power accounting for around 60%).

Although hydrogen can be used in adapted internal combustion engines, fuel cells, being electrochemical, have an efficiency advantage over heat engines. Fuel cells are more expensive to produce than common internal combustion engines but also require higher purity hydrogen fuel than internal combustion engines.

In the light road vehicle segment including passenger cars, by the end of 2022, 70,200 fuel cell electric vehicles had been sold worldwide, compared with 26 million plug-in electric vehicles. With the rapid rise of electric vehicles and associated battery technology and infrastructure, hydrogen's role in cars is minuscule.

=== Energy system balancing and storage ===
Green hydrogen, from electrolysis of water, has the potential to address the variability of renewable energy output. Hydrogen energy is a clean fuel that produces only water when used in fuel cells. While most hydrogen comes from natural gas, green hydrogen from renewables offers a zero-emission alternative. Producing green hydrogen can both reduce the need for renewable power curtailment during periods of high renewables output and be stored long-term to provide for power generation during periods of low output.

=== Ammonia ===
An alternative to gaseous hydrogen as an energy carrier is to bond it with nitrogen from the air to produce ammonia, which can be easily liquefied, transported, and used (directly or indirectly) as a clean and renewable fuel. Among disadvantages of ammonia as an energy carrier are its high toxicity, energy efficiency of NH_{3} production from N_{2} and H_{2}, and poisoning of PEM Fuel Cells by traces of non-decomposed NH_{3} after NH_{3} to N_{2} conversion.

=== Buildings ===
Numerous industry groups (gas networks, gas boiler manufacturers) across the natural gas supply chain are promoting hydrogen combustion boilers for space and water heating, and hydrogen appliances for cooking, to reduce energy-related CO_{2} emissions from residential and commercial buildings. The proposition is that current end-users of piped natural gas can await the conversion of and supply of hydrogen to existing natural gas grids, and then swap heating and cooking appliances, and that there is no need for consumers to do anything now.

A review of 32 studies on the question of hydrogen for heating buildings, independent of commercial interests, found that the economics and climate benefits of hydrogen for heating and cooking generally compare very poorly with the deployment of district heating networks, electrification of heating (principally through heat pumps) and cooking, the use of solar thermal, waste heat and the installation of energy efficiency measures to reduce energy demand for heat. Due to inefficiencies in hydrogen production, using blue hydrogen to replace natural gas for heating could require three times as much methane, while using green hydrogen would need two to three times as much electricity as heat pumps. Hybrid heat pumps, which combine the use of an electric heat pump with a hydrogen boiler, may play a role in residential heating in areas where upgrading networks to meet peak electrical demand would otherwise be costly.

The widespread use of hydrogen for heating buildings would entail higher energy system costs, higher heating costs and higher environmental impacts than the alternatives, although a niche role may be appropriate in specific contexts and geographies. If deployed, using hydrogen in buildings would drive up the cost of hydrogen for harder-to-decarbonize applications in industry and transport.

=== Bio-SNG ===
As of 2019 although technically possible production of syngas from hydrogen and carbon-dioxide from bio-energy with carbon capture and storage (BECCS) via the Sabatier reaction is limited by the amount of sustainable bioenergy available: therefore any bio-SNG made may be reserved for production of aviation biofuel.

=== SNG ===
Synthetic Natural Gas (SNG) can be produced from low rank coal/lignite by using hydrogen.

== Safety ==
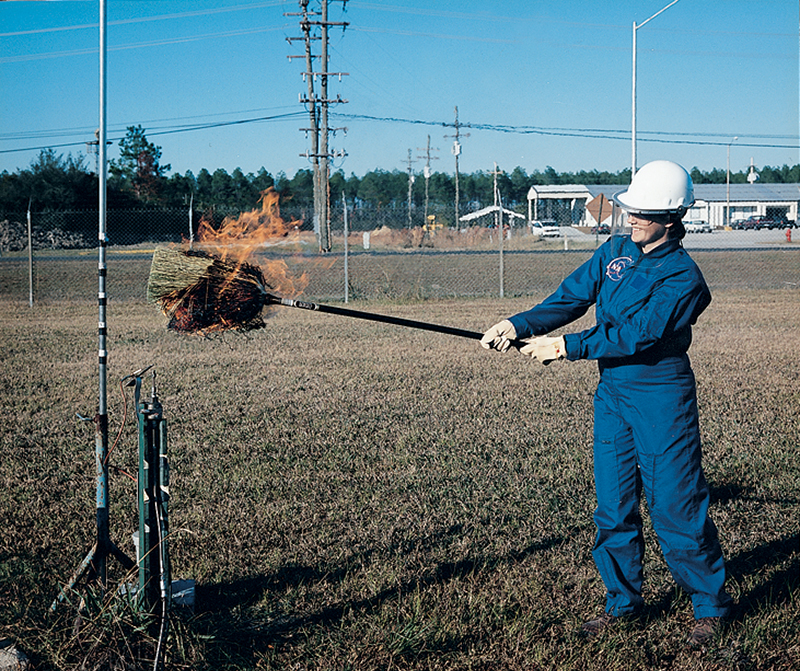
A NASA engineer sweeps an area with a corn broom to find the location of a hydrogen fire. Hydrogen burns with a nearly-invisible flame.

In hydrogen pipelines and steel storage vessels, hydrogen molecules are prone to react with metals, causing hydrogen embrittlement and leaks in the pipeline or storage vessel. Since it is lighter than air, hydrogen does not easily accumulate to form a combustible gas mixture. However, even without ignition sources, high-pressure hydrogen leakage may cause spontaneous combustion and detonation.

Hydrogen is flammable when mixed even in small amounts with air. Ignition can occur at a volumetric ratio of hydrogen to air as low as 4%. In approximately 70% of hydrogen ignition accidents, the ignition source cannot be found, and it is widely believed by scholars that spontaneous ignition of hydrogen occurs.

Hydrogen fire, while being extremely hot, is almost invisible, and thus can lead to accidental burns. Hydrogen, like most gases, can cause asphyxiation in the absence of adequate ventilation.

== Climate effects ==
One of the motivations for adopting a hydrogen economy is to limit climate change by replacing certain uses of fossil fuels with hydrogen. This is because hydrogen is not a direct greenhouse gas and the major waste product is water vapour, which has a negligible warming effect when emitted at the surface. However, hydrogen is considered to have an indirect warming effect due to interactions with greenhouse gases, particularly methane, ozone and stratospheric water vapour. The overall reductions in global warming due to replacing fossil fuels with low carbon hydrogen may therefore be partially offset by hydrogen leaking from infrastructure.

The magnitude of this offset depends on the leakage rate that future hydrogen infrastructure might have. However, in most cases this offset is unlikely to outweigh the climate benefits of replacing fossil fuels with hydrogen (except at very short time horizons and under high hydrogen leakage rates). For blue hydrogen, additionally the leakage of methane used to drive SMR and imperfect carbon capture will offset the climate benefits, but the offset depends strongly on the assumptions made.

== Hydrogen infrastructure ==
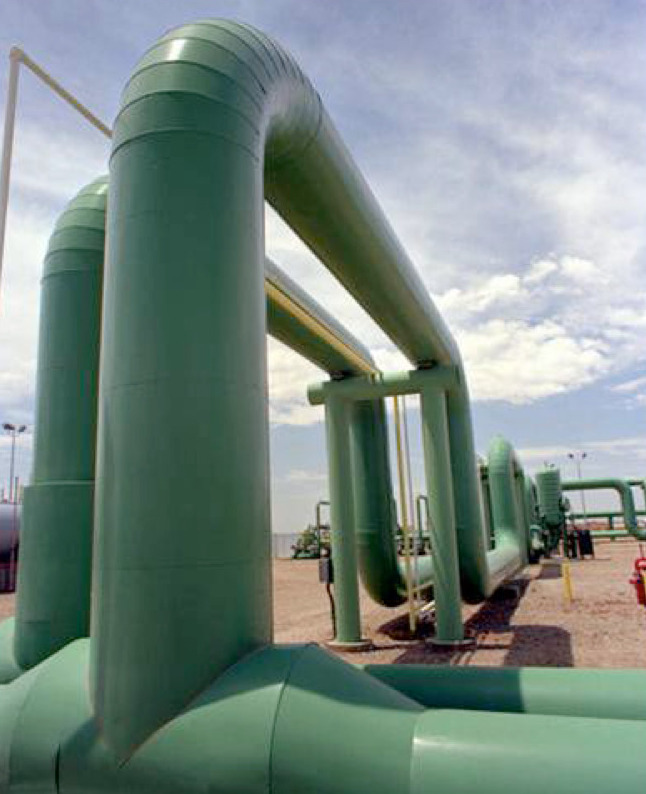
Hydrogen pipelines

A hydrogen infrastructure is the infrastructure of points of hydrogen production, truck and pipeline transport, and hydrogen stations for the distribution and sale of hydrogen fuel, and thus a crucial prerequisite before a successful commercialization of fuel cell technology.

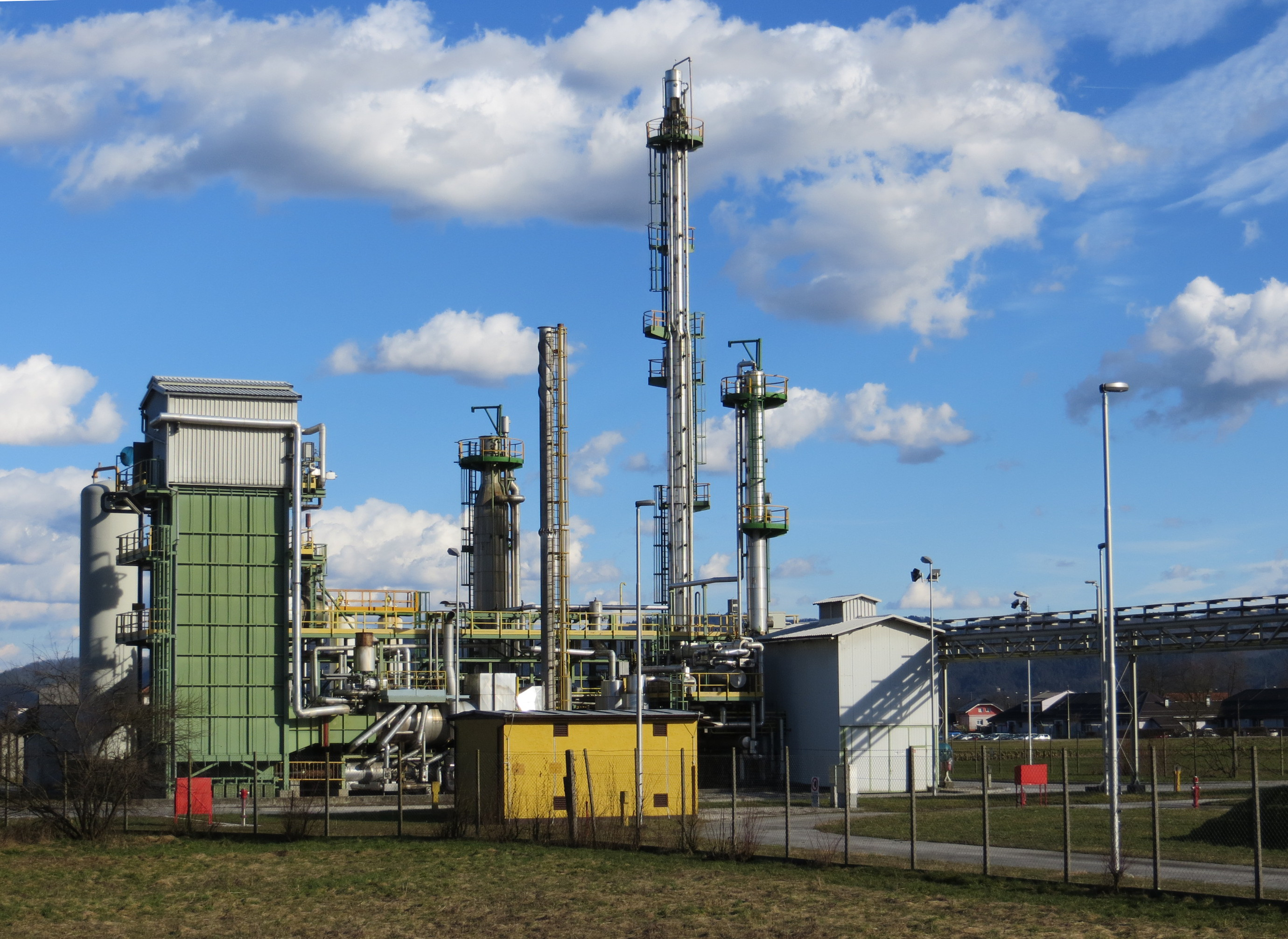
Hydrogen gasification plant for Belinka Perkemija, 2015

Hydrogen stations which are not situated near a hydrogen pipeline get supply via compressed hydrogen tube trailers, liquid hydrogen trailers, liquid hydrogen tank trucks or dedicated onsite production. Pipelines are the cheapest way to move hydrogen over long distances but must be designed to withstand the leakage and steel embrittlement caused by the hydrogen molecule. Hydrogen gas piping is routine in large oil-refineries, because hydrogen is used to hydrocrack fuels from crude oil. The IEA recommends existing industrial ports be used for production and natural gas pipelines for transport, international co-operation and shipping.

South Korea and Japan, which as of 2019 lacked international electrical interconnectors, were investing in the hydrogen economy. In March 2020, the Fukushima Hydrogen Energy Research Field was opened in Japan, claiming to be the world's largest hydrogen production facility. Much of the site is occupied by a solar array; power from the grid is also used for electrolysis of water to produce hydrogen fuel.

=== Storage ===
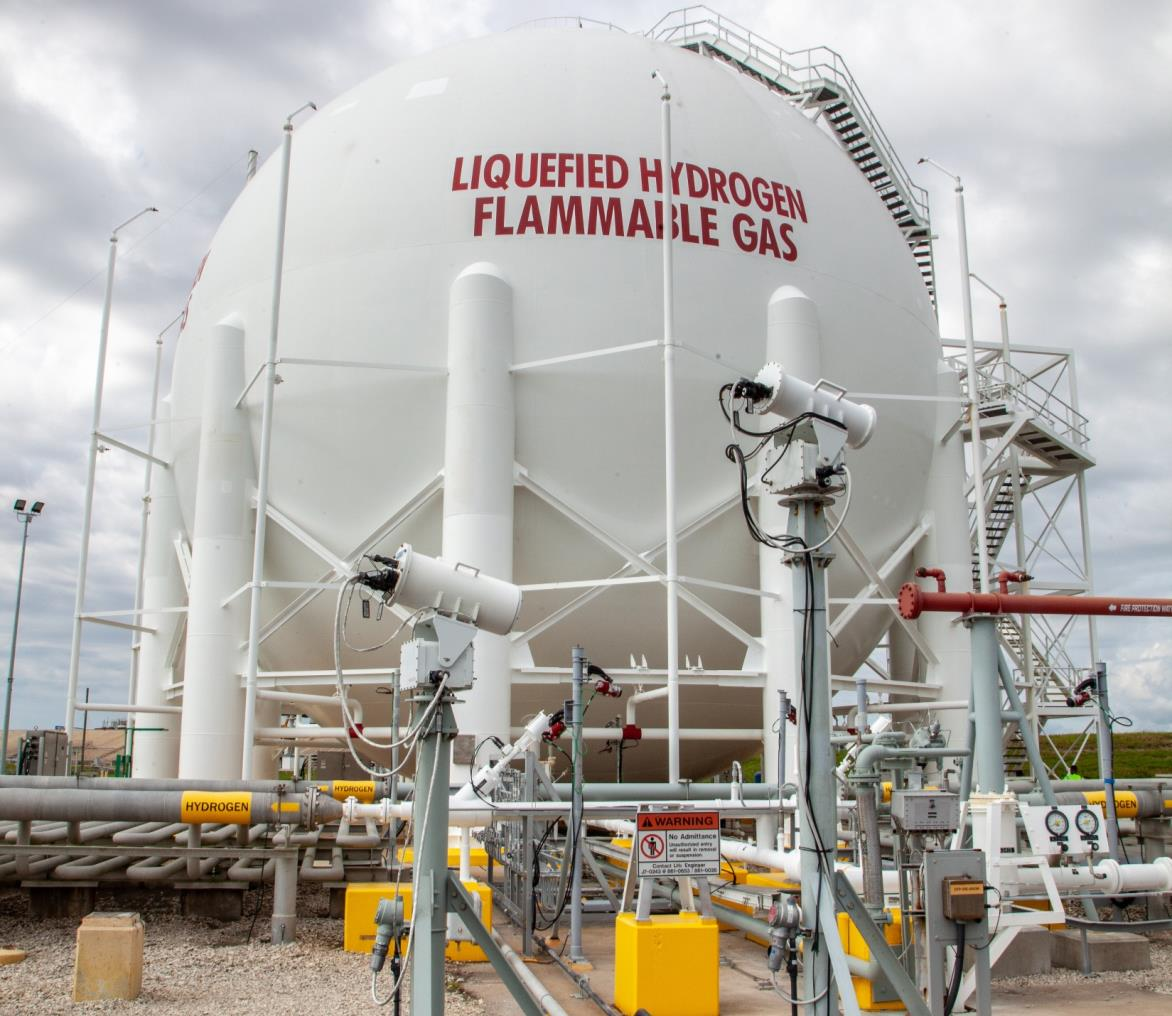
Liquid hydrogen Tank at NASA Kennedy Space Center

Several methods exist for storing hydrogen. These include mechanical approaches such as using high pressures and low temperatures, or employing chemical compounds that release H_{2} upon demand. While large amounts of hydrogen are produced by various industries, it is mostly consumed at the site of production, notably for the synthesis of ammonia. For many years hydrogen has been stored as compressed gas or cryogenic liquid, and transported as such in cylinders, tubes, and cryogenic tanks for use in industry or as propellant in space programs. The overarching challenge is the very low boiling point of H_{2}: it boils around 20.268 K (−252.882 °C or −423.188 °F). Achieving such low temperatures requires expending significant energy.

Although molecular hydrogen has very high energy density on a mass basis, partly because of its low molecular weight, as a gas at ambient conditions it has very low energy density by volume. If it is to be used as fuel stored on board a vehicle, pure hydrogen gas must be stored in an energy-dense form to provide sufficient driving range. Because hydrogen is the smallest molecule, it easily escapes from containers. Its effective 100-year global warming potential (GWP100) is estimated to be 11.6 ± 2.8.

=== Power plants ===
Xcel Energy is going to build two combined cycle power plants in the Midwest that can mix 30% hydrogen with the natural gas. Intermountain Power Plant is being retrofitted to a natural gas/hydrogen power plant that can run on 30% hydrogen as well, and is scheduled to run on pure hydrogen by 2045.

== Costs ==
More widespread use of hydrogen in economies entails the need for investment and costs in its production, storage, distribution and use. Estimates of hydrogen's cost are therefore complex and need to make assumptions about the cost of energy inputs (typically gas and electricity), production plant and method (e.g. green or blue hydrogen), technologies used (e.g. alkaline or proton exchange membrane electrolysers), storage and distribution methods, and how different cost elements might change over time. These factors are incorporated into calculations of the levelized costs of hydrogen (LCOH). The following table shows a range of estimates of the levelized costs of gray, blue, and green hydrogen, expressed in terms of US$ per kg of H_{2} (where data provided in other currencies or units, the average exchange rate to US dollars in the given year are used, and 1 kg of H_{2} is assumed to have a calorific value of 33.3kWh).

Production method	Note	Current cost (2020–2022)	Projected 2030 cost	Projected 2050 cost
Gray hydrogen (not including a carbon tax)
International Energy Agency	2022 costs estimated for June, when gas prices peaked in the wake of Russia's invasion of Ukraine	2021: 1.0–2.5	–	–
International Energy Agency	2022 costs estimated for June, when gas prices peaked in the wake of Russia's invasion of Ukraine	2022: 4.8–7.8	–	–
PWC		2021: 1.2–2.4
Blue hydrogen
International Energy Agency	2022 costs estimated for June, when gas prices peaked in the wake of Russia's invasion of Ukraine	2021: 1.5–3.0	–	–
International Energy Agency	2022 costs estimated for June, when gas prices peaked in the wake of Russia's invasion of Ukraine	2022: 5.3–8.6	–	–
UK government	Range dependent on gas price	2020: 1.6–2.7	1.6–2.7	1.6–2.8
GEP		2022: 2.8–3.5	-	-
Energy Transitions Commission		2020: 1.5–2.4	1.3–2.3	1.4–2.2
Green hydrogen
International Energy Agency	2030 and 2050 estimates are using solar power in regions with good solar conditions	2021: 4.0–9.0	<1.5	<1.0
International Energy Agency	2030 and 2050 estimates are using solar power in regions with good solar conditions	2022: 3.0-4.3	<1.5	<1.0
UK government	Using grid electricity, UK specific; range dependent on electricity price, and electrolyser technology and cost	2020: 4.9–7.9	4.4–6.6	4.0–6.3
UK government	Using otherwise curtailed renewable electricity, UK specific; range dependent on electrolyser technology and cost	2020: 2.4–7.9	1.7–5.6	1.5–4.6
IRENA		2020: 2.2–5.2	1.4–4.1	1.1–3.4
GEP	Source notes green H_{2} production cost has fallen by 60% since 2010	2022: 3.0–6.0
Lazard		2022: 2.8–5.3
PWC		2021: 3.5–9.5	1.8–4.8	1.2–2.4
Energy Transitions Commission		2020: 2.6–3.6	1.0–1.7	0.7–1.2

The range of cost estimates for commercially available hydrogen production methods is broad. As of 2022, gray hydrogen is cheapest to produce without a tax on its CO_{2} emissions, followed by blue and green hydrogen. Blue hydrogen production costs are not anticipated to fall substantially by 2050, can be expected to fluctuate with natural gas prices and could face carbon taxes for uncaptured emissions.

The cost of electrolysers fell by 60% from 2010 to 2022, but rose 50% between 2021 and 2024. Oxford Institute for Energy Studies nevertheless projects that the cost of green hydrogen is likely to fall significantly towards 2030 and 2050, alongside the falling cost of renewable power generation. It is cheapest to produce green hydrogen with surplus renewable power that would otherwise be curtailed, which favors electrolyzers capable of responding to low and variable power levels.

A 2022 Goldman Sachs analysis anticipates that globally green hydrogen will achieve cost parity with grey hydrogen by 2030, earlier if a global carbon tax is placed on gray hydrogen. In terms of cost per unit of energy, blue and gray hydrogen will always cost more than the fossil fuels used in its production, while green hydrogen will always cost more than the renewable electricity used to make it.

Subsidies for clean hydrogen production are much higher in the US and EU than in India. The discovered price of green hydrogen in India is US$4.67 (INR 397) per kg as of June 2025.

== Examples and pilot programs ==
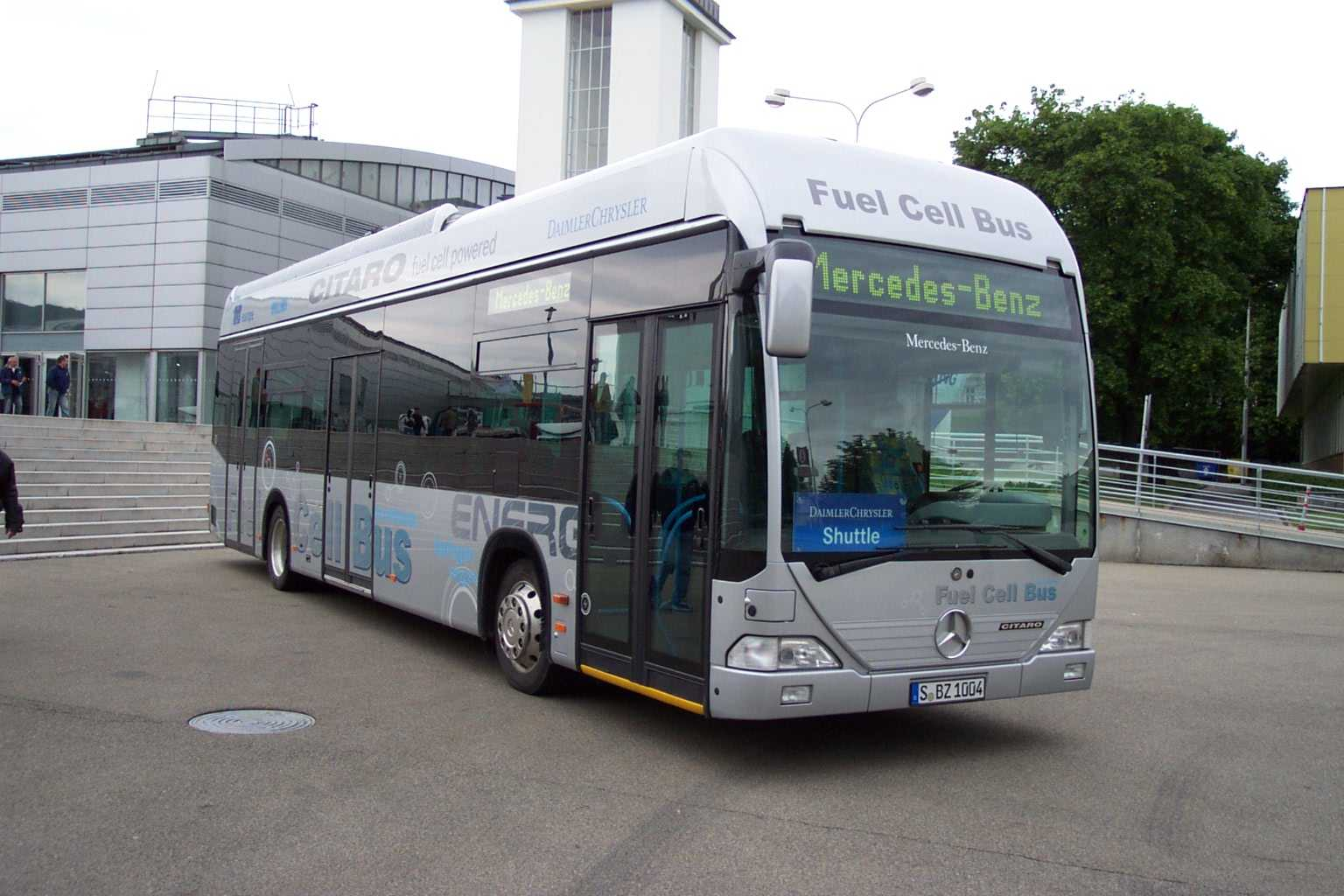
A Mercedes-Benz O530 Citaro powered by hydrogen fuel cells in Brno, Czech Republic

The distribution of hydrogen for the purpose of transportation is being tested around the world, particularly in the US (California, Canada, Japan, the EU (Portugal, Norway, the Netherlands, Denmark, Germany), and Iceland.

Also, fuel cell micro-CHP plants can be found in Japan and across the European Union. Such units can operate on hydrogen, or other fuels as natural gas or LPG. Under the ene.field and PACE projects — both co-funded by the Fuel Cells and Hydrogen Joint Undertaking (FCH JU) — a total of approximately 3,646 fuel cell micro-CHP units were installed across the European Union and the UK.

=== Australia ===
Western Australia's Department of Planning and Infrastructure operated three Daimler Chrysler Citaro fuel cell buses as part of its Sustainable Transport Energy for Perth Fuel Cells Bus Trial in Perth from 2004 to 2007.

By November 2020 the Australian Renewable Energy Agency (ARENA) had invested $55 million in 28 hydrogen projects, from early stage research and development to early stage trials and deployments. The agency's stated goal is to produce hydrogen by electrolysis for $2 per kilogram, announced by Minister for Energy and Emissions Angus Taylor in a 2021 Low Emissions Technology Statement.

In October 2021, Queensland Premier Annastacia Palaszczuk and private investor Andrew Forrest announced that Queensland would be home to the world's largest hydrogen plant. This was scrapped in 2025.

In November 2024, the South Australian Government's plan to spend A$593 million on a 200MW hydrogen energy plant near Whyalla was granted federal approval under the EPBC Act. The project was to be developed by the Office of Hydrogen Power SA, ATCO Australia, and BOC, and intended "to supply additional grid stability for homes and businesses around the state, by using excess renewable energy generated from large-scale wind and solar farms to provide a consistent output of supply". Construction was scheduled to start in 2025, with completion and commissioning happening in 2026. This plan was scrapped in early 2025

=== China ===
In early 2022, China released the *Medium- and Long-Term Plan for the Development of the Hydrogen Energy Industry (2021–2035)*, outlining new development targets for the hydrogen sector over the subsequent 15 years. In November 2024, the *Energy Law of the People's Republic of China* was promulgated; effective January 1, 2025, this legislation officially conferred "energy" status upon hydrogen.

By 2026, China's total annual hydrogen production is projected to reach between 38 million and 40 million tons, accounting for 30% to 35% of the global total. This output is expected to comprise approximately 60% fossil-fuel-based hydrogen ("gray hydrogen"), 25% industrial by-product hydrogen ("blue hydrogen" or "quasi-blue hydrogen"), and 15% water-electrolysis-based hydrogen ("green hydrogen"). Notably, the production capacity for renewable-energy-based hydrogen (green hydrogen) is set to officially surpass 1 million tons per year. Furthermore, the cost of green hydrogen is expected to decline significantly: leveraging large-scale wind and solar power bases (such as those in Inner Mongolia and Xinjiang), the ex-factory cost of green hydrogen in certain regions is projected to drop to 12–15 RMB/kg, thereby beginning to demonstrate the potential to compete with gray hydrogen (produced from coal or natural gas) [100]. Regarding electrolyzer technology, China's production capacity for electrolyzers is expected to exceed 70% of the global total. The hydrogen output of single alkaline (ALK) electrolyzer units is projected to increase to 5,000 Nm³/h, while Proton Exchange Membrane (PEM) and Anion Exchange Membrane (AEM) technologies are also expected to achieve large-scale commercial shipment volumes.

In the realm of storage and transportation, infrastructure is expected to evolve into an interconnected network. In 2026, China is set to officially launch "Comprehensive Hydrogen Energy Application Pilot Programs," with a specific focus on establishing hydrogen-dedicated highways. Provinces and municipalities—including Guangdong, Shandong, and the Beijing-Tianjin-Hebei region—have already taken the lead in implementing policies that grant hydrogen-powered vehicles free or discounted access to expressways. Regarding hydrogen pipelines, demonstration projects for long-distance, high-pressure pure hydrogen pipelines—such as the "West-to-East Hydrogen Transmission" initiative—are expected to enter the operational phase, thereby addressing the demand for transporting green hydrogen from the northwestern regions to the eastern coastal areas. Significant breakthroughs are also anticipated in hydrogen storage: 70 MPa high-pressure gaseous hydrogen storage is expected to become a standard feature in heavy-duty trucks, while ton-scale solid-state hydrogen storage systems (utilizing magnesium- or titanium-based materials) are expected to see demonstration applications within the field of hydrogen metallurgy. Additionally, ammonia (NH3)-based hydrogen storage solutions are expected to find practical application across storage, transportation, and automotive sectors. A million-cubic-meter-scale salt cavern hydrogen storage demonstration project officially commenced operations in Pingdingshan, Henan Province, in April 2026.

Application Sector: Shifting from transportation to the "main battlefield" of industry. Over 600 hydrogen refueling stations have been constructed; fuel cell stack lifetimes have surpassed the 25,000 to 30,000-hour mark; and high-power (260 kW+) fuel cell systems have entered mass production. By 2026, the cost of high-power stacks (exceeding 200 kW) had declined by approximately 40% compared to two years prior. Hydrogen-powered heavy-duty trucks are transitioning from pilot projects to large-scale commercial operations, with individual fleet sizes now exceeding 1,200 vehicles. Liquid hydrogen heavy-duty trucks can easily achieve driving ranges exceeding 1,000 kilometers and have entered small-scale mass production. These hydrogen heavy trucks cover a diverse range of applications—including short-haul shuttles for mines and steel mills, port logistics, and long-distance inter-provincial coal transport—with a cumulative deployment reaching 50,000 units. As of April 2026, China’s cumulative deployment of hydrogen-powered mining trucks exceeded 1,200 units. Wide-body dump trucks (70–100-ton class) account for approximately 70% of this total, followed by ultra-heavy-duty rigid mining trucks (over 200-ton class) at about 20%, and emerging technology models (liquid hydrogen/ammonia-hydrogen) at roughly 10%. These vehicles are concentrated in the regions of Inner Mongolia, Xinjiang, Ningxia, and Shanxi, where they have been operating for over three years under extremely harsh environmental conditions. With the direct supply cost of green hydrogen dropping to around 15 RMB/kg, the Total Cost of Ownership (TCO) for hydrogen mining trucks operating under continuous 24-hour duty cycles has become nearly comparable to that of diesel-powered vehicles. In 2026, China’s hydrogen mining trucks were successfully exported to major mining conglomerates in Australia’s Pilbara region (350+ units), Southeast Asia (Indonesia: 200+ units), and South America (Chile and Peru: 120+ units). Hydrogen Ports: Four major hydrogen port clusters have taken shape, centered around the ports of Qingdao, Ningbo-Zhoushan, Tianjin, and Shenzhen Yantian. The total number of hydrogen-enabled ports nationwide now exceeds 20. Within these ports, the fleet of hydrogen-powered heavy-duty trucks and container trucks stands at approximately 5,000 to 8,000 vehicles. Hydrogen-powered rail-mounted gantry cranes and automated terminal equipment have been deployed for routine operations, while the self-sufficiency rate for green hydrogen supply within these ports has reached approximately 35%. Furthermore, high-power hydrogen fuel cell tugboats have commenced operations in the Pearl River Delta and Yangtze River Delta regions. By 2026, the national fleet of hydrogen-powered public buses is projected to number between 12,000 and 14,000 vehicles. These buses are primarily concentrated in regions with access to low-cost green hydrogen sources—such as Beijing, Zhangjiakou, Zhengzhou, and certain extreme-cold climate zones. Conversely, between 2024 and early 2026, cities like Foshan and Guangzhou experienced a "wave of service suspensions"; this phenomenon was triggered by a confluence of factors, including the expiration of local subsidies (necessitating the procurement of hydrogen from external sources at higher costs) and the end of the operational lifespan of fuel cell stacks. Consequently, other cities lacking access to affordable local hydrogen supplies have also begun adjusting their respective local policies. Green Chemicals: The primary focus of hydrogen application is shifting from the transportation sector toward industrial decarbonization. Million-ton-scale, near-zero-carbon steel production lines have achieved stable operation, marking the first instance where hydrogen has successfully replaced traditional coke as a reducing agent. Additionally, a project in Ningxia—integrating a 150,000-ton-per-year green hydrogen facility with coal chemical production—has officially commenced operations. Projects for the production of green ammonia and green alcohols (specifically green methanol) are coming online in rapid succession, directly addressing the rigid decarbonization demands of the shipping and refining industries. By 2026, hydrogen-powered trains and distributed hydrogen power generation stations are no longer considered novelties; indeed, cutting-edge explorations have even emerged at the intersection of hydrogen technology, quantum computing, and embodied AI.

=== European Union ===
EU Member States which have a relatively large natural gas pipeline system already in place include Italy, Belgium, Germany, France, and the Netherlands. In 2020, The EU launched its European Clean Hydrogen Alliance (ECHA).

==== France ====
Green hydrogen has become more common in France. A €150 million Green Hydrogen Plan was established in 2019, and it calls for building the infrastructure necessary to create, store, and distribute hydrogen as well as using the fuel to power local transportation systems like buses and trains. Corridor H2, a similar initiative, will create a network of hydrogen distribution facilities in Occitania along the route between the Mediterranean and the North Sea. The Corridor H2 project will get a €40 million loan from the EIB.

==== Germany ====
German car manufacturer BMW has been working with hydrogen for years.. The German government has announced plans to hold tenders for 5.5 GW of new hydrogen-ready gas-fired power plants and 2 GW of "comprehensive H2-ready modernisations" of existing gas power stations at the end of 2024 or beginning of 2025

==== Iceland ====
Iceland has committed to becoming the world's first hydrogen economy by the year 2050. Iceland is in a unique position. As of 2024-2026, Iceland continues to import nearly all the petroleum products necessary to power its transportation and fishing fleet. Iceland has large geothermal resources, making the transition to a hydrogen economy easier.

Iceland already converts its surplus electricity into exportable goods and hydrocarbon replacements. In 2002, it produced 2,000 tons of hydrogen gas by electrolysis, primarily for the production of ammonia (NH_{3}) for fertilizer. Ammonia is produced, transported, and used throughout the world, and 90% of the cost of ammonia is the cost of the energy to produce it.

Neither industry directly replaces hydrocarbons. Reykjavík, Iceland, had a small pilot fleet of city buses running on compressed hydrogen, and research on powering the nation's fishing fleet with hydrogen is under way (for example by companies as Icelandic New Energy). For more practical purposes, Iceland might process imported oil with hydrogen to extend it, rather than to replace it altogether.

The Reykjavík buses are part of a larger program, HyFLEET:CUTE, operating hydrogen fueled buses in eight European cities. HyFLEET:CUTE buses were also operated in Beijing, China and Perth, Australia (see below). A pilot project demonstrating a hydrogen economy is operational on the Norwegian island of Utsira. The installation combines wind power and hydrogen power. In periods when there is surplus wind energy, the excess power is used for generating hydrogen by electrolysis. The hydrogen is stored, and is available for power generation in periods when there is little wind.

=== India ===
The discovered price of green hydrogen in India is US$3.9 (INR 328) per kg as of July 2025. The discovered price of green ammonia in India is US$641 (INR 55,750) per tonne as of July 2025.

India is said to adopt hydrogen and H-CNG, due to several reasons, amongst which the fact that a national rollout of natural gas networks is already taking place and natural gas is already a major vehicle fuel. In addition, India suffers from extreme air pollution in urban areas. According to some estimates, nearly 80% of India's hydrogen is projected to be green, driven by cost declines and new production technologies.

Currently however, hydrogen energy is just at the Research, Development and Demonstration (RD&D) stage. As a result, the number of hydrogen stations may still be low, although much more are expected to be introduced soon.

=== Poland ===
It planning open first hydrogen publication stations, The Ministry of Climate and Environment (MKiŚ) will soon schan competitions for 2-3 hydrogen refueling stations, Polish Deputy Minister in this ministry Krzysztof Bolesta.

=== Saudi Arabia ===
Saudi Arabia as a part of the NEOM project, is looking to produce roughly 1.2 million tonnes of green ammonia a year, beginning production in 2025.

In Cairo, Egypt, Saudi real estate funding skyscraper project powered by hydrogen.

=== South Korea ===
The Ulsan Green Hydrogen Town is a hydrogen city project being developed in Ulsan. As of October 2024, 188 km of underground pipelines have been laid to connect hydrogen produced as a byproduct from petrochemical complexes to the city center.

=== Turkey ===
The Turkish Ministry of Energy and Natural Resources and the United Nations Industrial Development Organization created the International Centre for Hydrogen Energy Technologies (UNIDO-ICHET) in Istanbul in 2004 and it ran to 2012. In 2023 the ministry published a Hydrogen Technologies Strategy and Roadmap.

=== United Kingdom ===
The UK started a fuel cell pilot program in January 2004, the program ran two Fuel cell buses on route 25 in London until December 2005, and switched to route RV1 until January 2007. The Hydrogen Expedition is currently working to create a hydrogen fuel cell-powered ship and using it to circumnavigate the globe, as a way to demonstrate the capability of hydrogen fuel cells.

In 2009, Dr Graham Cooley was appointed CEO of ITM Power PLC, a manufacturer of electrolysers for green hydrogen production. Cooley raised almost £500 million for ITM and in 2021 opened the world’s largest electrolyser manufacturing facility in Sheffield. Cooley also served as a member of the UK Government’s Hydrogen Advisory Council.

In August 2021 the UK Government claimed it was the first to have a Hydrogen Strategy and produced a document.

In August 2021, Chris Jackson quit as chair of the UK Hydrogen and Fuel Cell Association, a leading hydrogen industry association, claiming that UK and Norwegian oil companies had intentionally inflated their cost projections for blue hydrogen in order to maximize future technology support payments by the UK government.

=== United States ===
Several domestic U.S. automobile companies have developed vehicles using hydrogen, such as GM and Toyota. However, as of February 2020, hydrogen infrastructure was underdeveloped in the U.S. except in some parts of California. A joint venture existed between NREL and Xcel Energy to combine wind power and hydrogen power in Colorado. In the early 2000s, Newfoundland and Labrador Hydro was converting the wind-diesel Power System on the remote island of Ramea into a Wind-Hydrogen Hybrid Power Systems facility.

In 2006, a Florida hydrogen infrastructure project was planned, including public bus transportation in Orlando, where Ford Motor Company planned to run a fleet of hydrogen-fueled Ford E-450s. A Liquidated hydrogen mobile system was built at Titusville. An FPL’s pilot clean hydrogen facility operated in Okeechobee County.

A similar pilot project on Stuart Island used solar power and batteries to generate and store electricity to produce hydrogen by electrolysis and store it for later production of electricity by fuel cell.

=== Vietnam ===
Việt Nam Energy Association have included green hydrogenation support. Australian clean energy company Pure Hydrogen Corporation Limited announced on July 22 that it has signed an MoU with Vietnam public transportation.

== See also ==
- Alternative fuel
- Biohydrogen
- Combined cycle hydrogen power plant
- Energy development
- Hydrogen damage
- Hydrogen fuel cell power plant
- Hydrogen internal combustion engine vehicle
- Hydrogen-powered aircraft
- Hydrogen-powered ship
- Hydrogen prize
- Hydrogen tanker
- Hydrogen train
- Lolland Hydrogen Community
- Methane pyrolysis
- Timeline of sustainable energy research 2020–present#Hydrogen energy
