= Fukushima Hydrogen Energy Research Field =

Fukushima Hydrogen Energy Research Field (FH2R) is the world's largest hydrogen production facility using renewable energy. It is located in Fukushima Prefecture in Japan. The construction was started in 2018 and it was inaugurated by Shinzo Abe in 2020. The facility uses 10 MW of solar electricity which is installed near the production facility. The facility can produce 1,200 Nm^{3} of hydrogen per hour. It was jointly established by the New Energy and Industrial Technology Development Organization, Toshiba Energy Systems & Solutions Corporation, Tohoku Electric Power and Iwatani Corporation.
