= Liquid hydrogen =

Liquid state of the element hydrogen

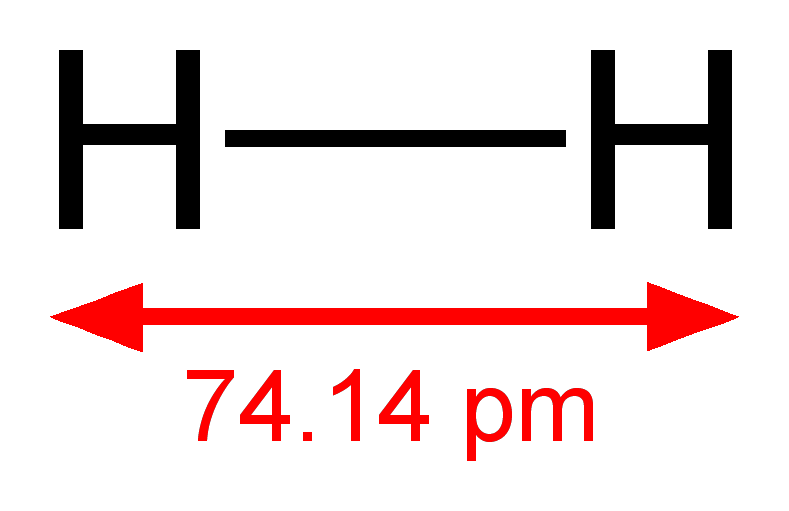

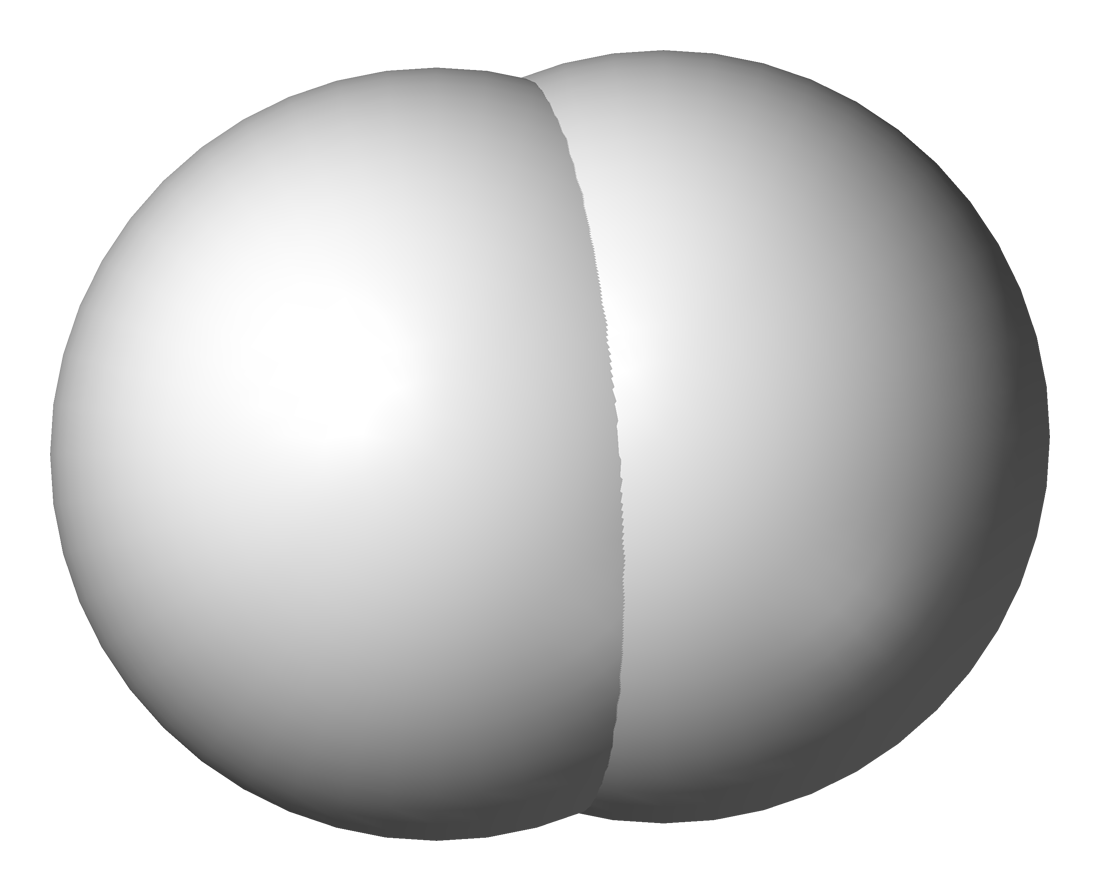

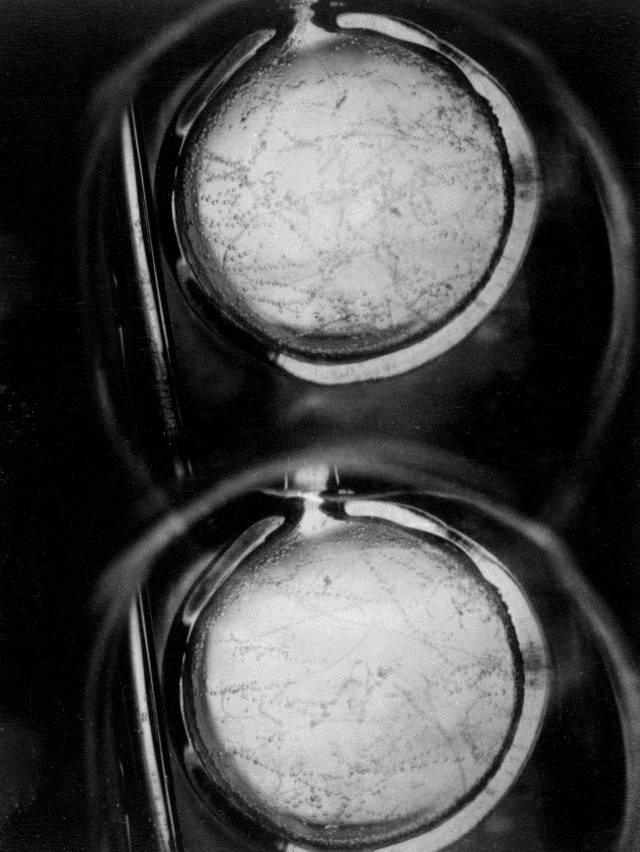

Names
- IUPAC name Hydrogen
- Systematic IUPAC name Liquid hydrogen
- Other names: Hydrogen (cryogenic liquid); Refrigerated hydrogen; LH_{2}; para-hydrogen

Identifiers
CAS Number	1333-74-0
3D model (JSmol)	Interactive image
ChEBI	CHEBI:33251
ChemSpider	762
KEGG	C00282
PubChem CID	783
RTECS number	MW8900000
UNII	7YNJ3PO35Z
UN number	1966
- InChI: InChI=1S/H2/h1H Key: UFHFLCQGNIYNRP-UHFFFAOYSA-N; InChI=1/H2/h1H
- SMILES: [H][H]

Properties
Chemical formula	H_{2}(l)
Molar mass	2.016 g·mol^{−1}
Appearance	Colorless liquid
Density	0.07085 g/cm^{3} (4.423 lb/cu ft)
Melting point	−259.14 °C (−434.45 °F; 14.01 K)
Boiling point	−252.87 °C (−423.17 °F; 20.28 K)

Hazards
- GHS labelling
Pictograms	(GHS02: Flammable) (GHS04: Compressed Gas)
Signal word	Danger
Hazard statements	H220, H280
Precautionary statements	P210, P377, P381, P403
NFPA 704 (fire diamond)	3 4 0 CRYO
Autoignition temperature	571 °C (1,060 °F; 844 K)
Explosive limits	LEL 4.0%; UEL 74.2% (in air)
- Except where otherwise noted, data are given for materials in their standard state (at 25 °C [77 °F], 100 kPa). verify (what is ?) Infobox references

Liquid hydrogen (H_{2}(l)) is the liquid state of the element hydrogen. Hydrogen is found naturally in the molecular H_{2} form.

To exist as a liquid, H_{2} must be cooled below its critical point of 33 K. However, for it to be in a fully liquid state at atmospheric pressure, H_{2} needs to be cooled to 20.28 K (−252.87 °C; −423.17 °F). A common method of obtaining liquid hydrogen involves a compressor resembling a jet engine in both appearance and principle. Liquid hydrogen is typically used as a concentrated form of hydrogen storage. Storing it as liquid takes less space than storing it as a gas at normal temperature and pressure. However, the liquid density is very low compared to other common fuels. Once liquefied, it can be maintained as a liquid for some time in thermally insulated containers.

There are two spin isomers of hydrogen. Room temperature hydrogen is 75% orthohydrogen. At cryogenic temperature it converts exothermically to parahydrogen. The thermodynamic lowest energy state for liquid hydrogen consists of 99.79% parahydrogen and 0.21% orthohydrogen. To avoid the exothermic heat release and resulting excessive boil-off in storage, catalytic conversion to parahydrogen during liquefaction is employed.

Hydrogen requires a theoretical minimum of 3.3 kWh/kg (12 MJ/kg) to liquefy, and 3.9 kWh/kg (14 MJ/kg) including converting the hydrogen to the para isomer. Existing liquefaction facilities use 10–13 kWh/kg (36–47 MJ/kg) compared to a 33 kWh/kg (119 MJ/kg) heating value of hydrogen. More recent work shows future facilities are expected to cut the specific energy demand by half to 6.5 kWh/kg (23 MJ/kg).

== History ==
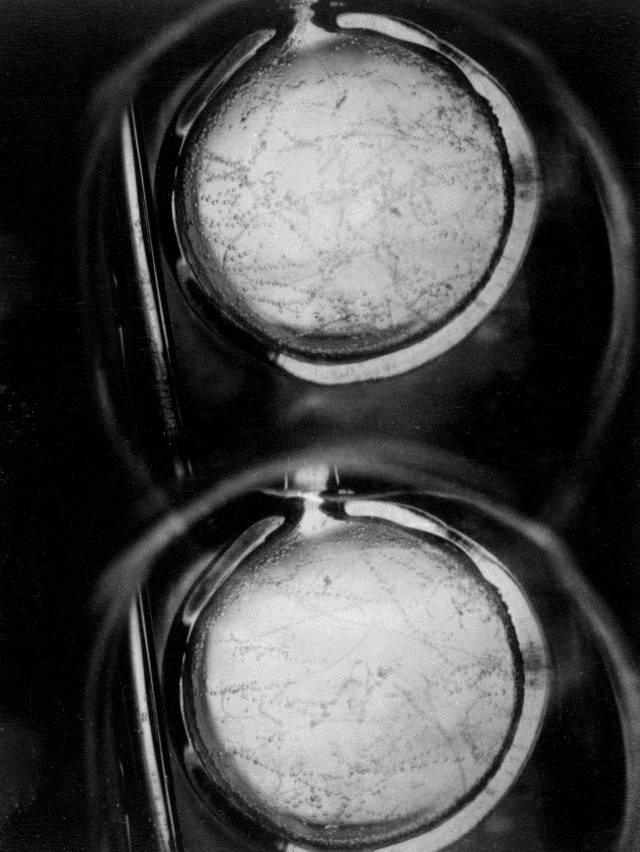
Liquid hydrogen bubbles forming in two glass flasks at the Bevatron laboratory in 1955

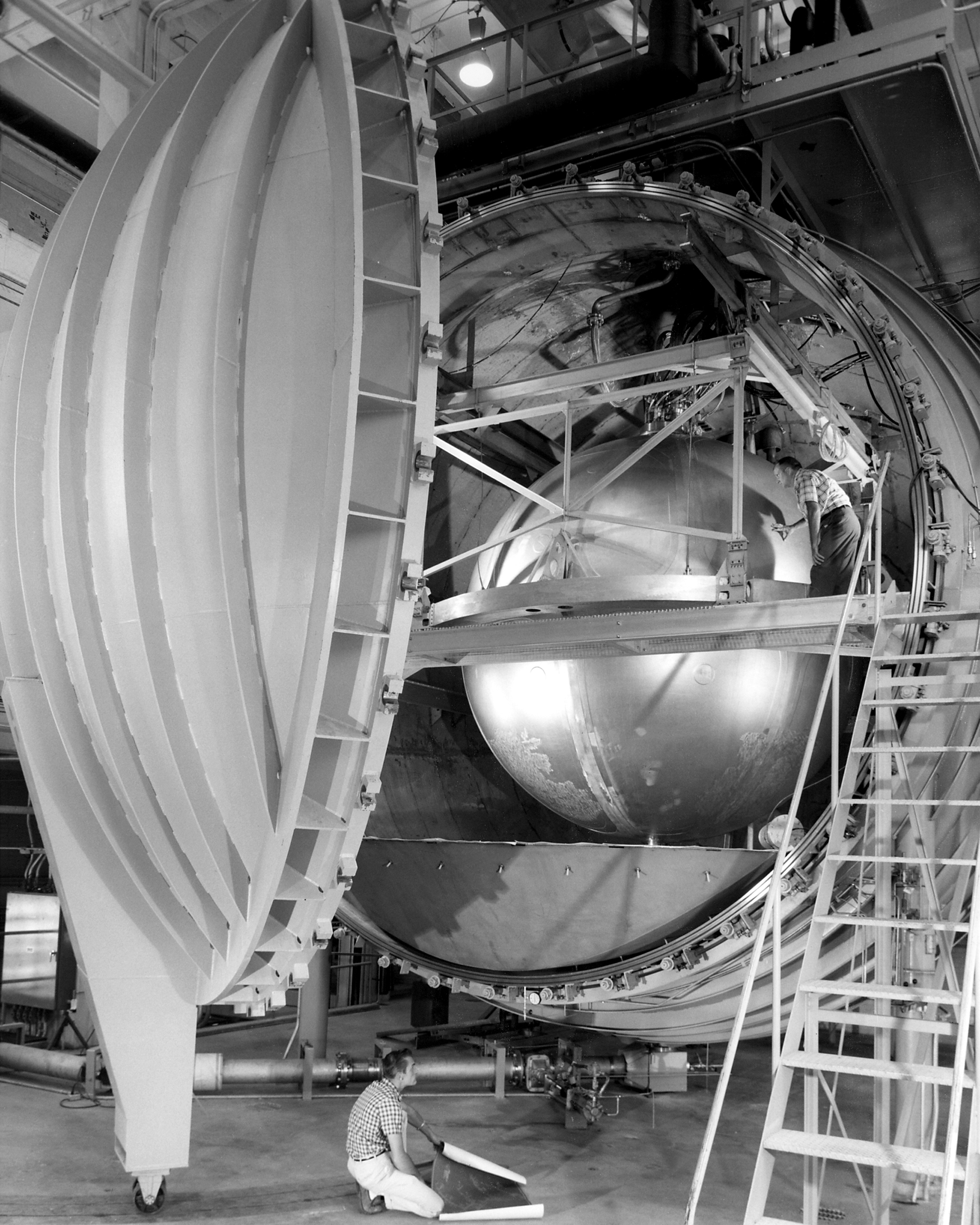
A large hydrogen tank in a vacuum chamber at the Glenn Research Center in Brook Park, Ohio, in 1967

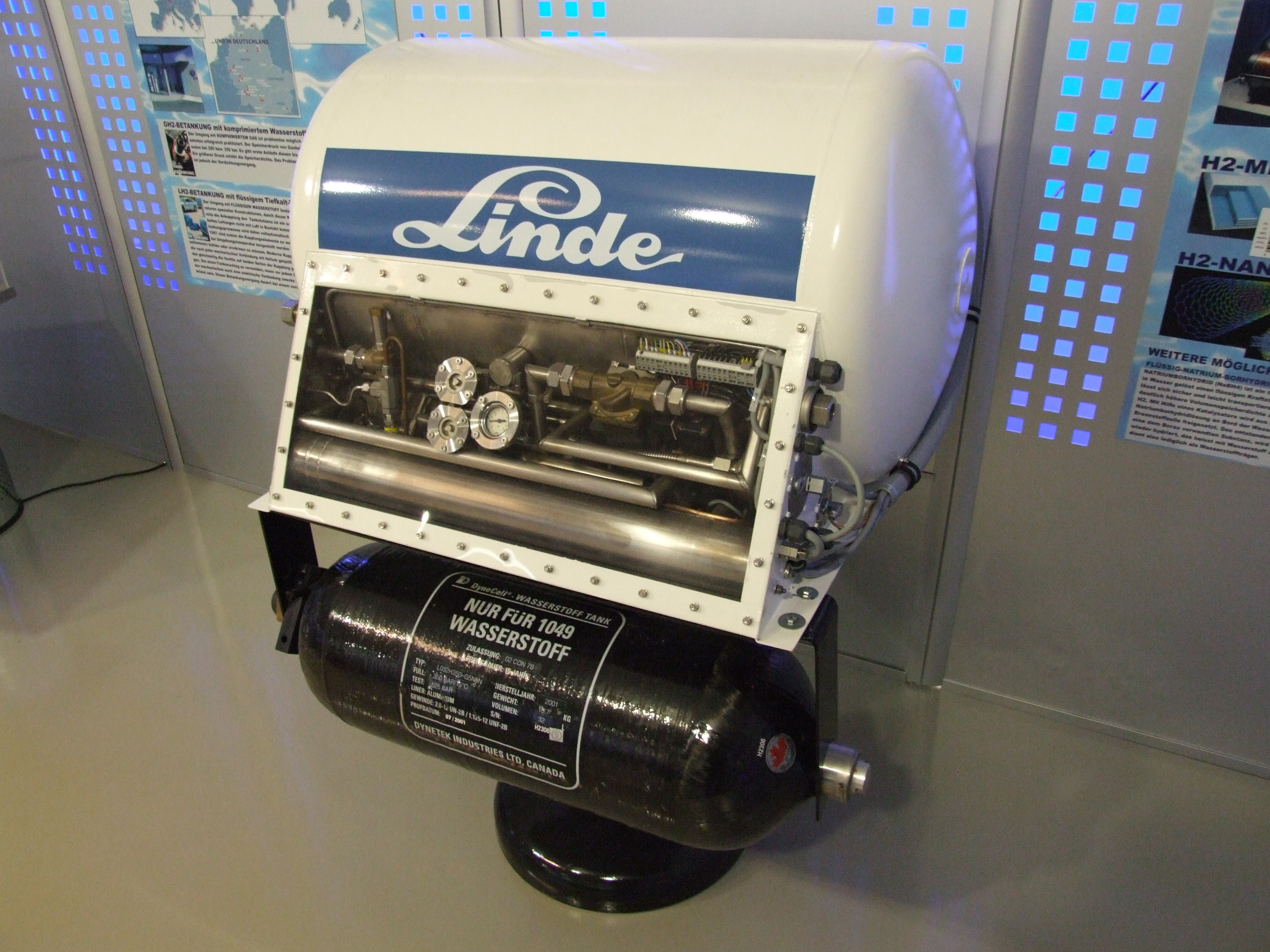
A Linde AG tank for liquid hydrogen at the Museum Autovision in Altlußheim, Germany, in 2008

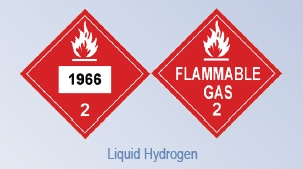
Two U.S. Department of Transportation placards indicating the presence of hazardous materials, which are used with liquid hydrogen

In 1885, Zygmunt Florenty Wróblewski published hydrogen's critical temperature as 33 K (−240.2 °C; −400.3 °F); critical pressure, 13.3 standard atmospheres (195 psi); and boiling point, 23 K (−250.2 °C; −418.3 °F).

In 1898, hydrogen was liquefied by James Dewar by using regenerative cooling and his invention, the vacuum flask. The first synthesis of the stable isomer form of liquid hydrogen, parahydrogen, was achieved by Paul Harteck and Karl Friedrich Bonhoeffer in 1929.

== Spin isomers of hydrogen ==
The two nuclei in a dihydrogen molecule can have two different spin states. Parahydrogen, in which the two nuclear spins are antiparallel, is more stable than orthohydrogen, in which the two are parallel. At room temperature, gaseous hydrogen is mostly in the ortho isomeric form due to thermal energy, but an ortho-enriched mixture is only metastable when liquefied at low temperature. It slowly undergoes an exothermic reaction to become the para isomer, with enough energy released as heat to cause some of the liquid to boil. To prevent loss of the liquid during long-term storage, it is therefore intentionally converted to the para isomer as part of the production process, typically using a catalyst such as iron(III) oxide, activated carbon, platinized asbestos, rare earth metals, uranium compounds, chromium(III) oxide, or some nickel compounds.

== Uses ==
Liquid hydrogen is a common liquid rocket fuel for rocketry application and is used by NASA and the U.S. Air Force, which operate a large number of liquid hydrogen tanks with an individual capacity up to 3.8 million liters (1 million U.S. gallons).

In most rocket engines fueled by liquid hydrogen, it first cools the nozzle and other parts before being mixed with the oxidizer, usually liquid oxygen, and burned to produce water with traces of ozone and hydrogen peroxide. Practical H_{2}–O_{2} rocket engines run fuel-rich so that the exhaust contains some unburned hydrogen. This reduces combustion chamber and nozzle erosion. It also reduces the molecular weight of the exhaust, which can increase specific impulse, despite the incomplete combustion.

Liquid hydrogen can be used as the fuel for an internal combustion engine or fuel cell. The MF Hydra ferry is powered by liquid hydrogen. Various submarines, including the Type 212 submarine, Type 214 submarine, and others, and concept hydrogen vehicles have been built using this form of hydrogen, such as the DeepC, BMW H2R, and others. Due to its similarity, builders can sometimes modify and share equipment with systems designed for liquefied natural gas (LNG). Liquid hydrogen is being investigated as a zero carbon fuel for aircraft. Because of the lower volumetric energy, the hydrogen volumes needed for combustion are large. Unless direct injection is used, a severe gas-displacement effect also hampers maximum breathing and increases pumping losses.

Liquid hydrogen is also used to cool neutrons to be used in neutron scattering. Since neutrons and hydrogen nuclei have similar masses, kinetic energy exchange per interaction is maximum (elastic collision). Superheated liquid hydrogen was also used in many bubble chamber experiments.

The first thermonuclear bomb, Ivy Mike, used liquid deuterium, also known as hydrogen-2, for nuclear fusion.

== Properties ==
The product of hydrogen combustion in a pure oxygen environment is solely water vapor. However, the high combustion temperatures and present atmospheric nitrogen can result in the breaking of N≡N bonds, forming toxic NOx if no exhaust scrubbing is done. Since water is often considered harmless to the environment, an engine burning it can be considered "zero emissions". In aviation, however, water vapor emitted in the atmosphere contributes to global warming (to a lesser extent than CO_{2}). Liquid hydrogen also has a much higher specific energy than gasoline, natural gas, or diesel.

The density of liquid hydrogen is only 70.85 kg/m^{3} (at 20 K), a relative density of just 0.07. Although the specific energy is more than twice that of other fuels, this gives it a remarkably low volumetric energy density, many fold lower.

Liquid hydrogen requires cryogenic storage technology such as special thermally insulated containers and requires special handling common to all cryogenic fuels. This is similar to, but more severe than liquid oxygen. Even with thermally insulated containers it is difficult to keep such a low temperature, and the hydrogen will gradually leak away (typically at a rate of 1% per day). It also shares many of the same safety issues as other forms of hydrogen, as well as being cold enough to liquefy, or even solidify atmospheric oxygen, which can be an explosion hazard.

The triple point of hydrogen is at 13.81 K and 7.042 kPa.

== Safety ==
Due to its cold temperatures, liquid hydrogen is a hazard for cold burns. Hydrogen itself is biologically inert and its only human health hazard as a vapor is displacement of oxygen, resulting in asphyxiation, and its very high flammability and ability to detonate when mixed with air. Because of its flammability, liquid hydrogen should be kept away from heat or flame unless ignition is intended. Unlike ambient-temperature gaseous hydrogen, which is lighter than air, hydrogen recently vaporized from liquid is so cold that it is heavier than air and can form flammable heavier-than-air hydrogen-air mixtures.

An indirect safety risk exists due to the cryogenic temperature being lower than the boiling point of oxygen. Exposure of insufficiently thermally insulated liquid hydrogen containers can result in air condensing on the outside of the container, leading to oxygen enrichment that can spontaneously ignite flammable materials.

== See also ==
- Industrial gas
- Liquefaction of gases
- Hydrogen safety
- Compressed hydrogen
- Cryo-adsorption
- Expansion ratio
- Gasoline gallon equivalent
- Slush hydrogen
- Solid hydrogen
- Metallic hydrogen
- Hydrogen infrastructure
- Hydrogen-powered aircraft
- Liquid hydrogen tank car
- Liquid hydrogen tanktainer
- Hydrogen tanker
