= Hydrogen infrastructure =

Infrastructure for hydrogen transport and distribution

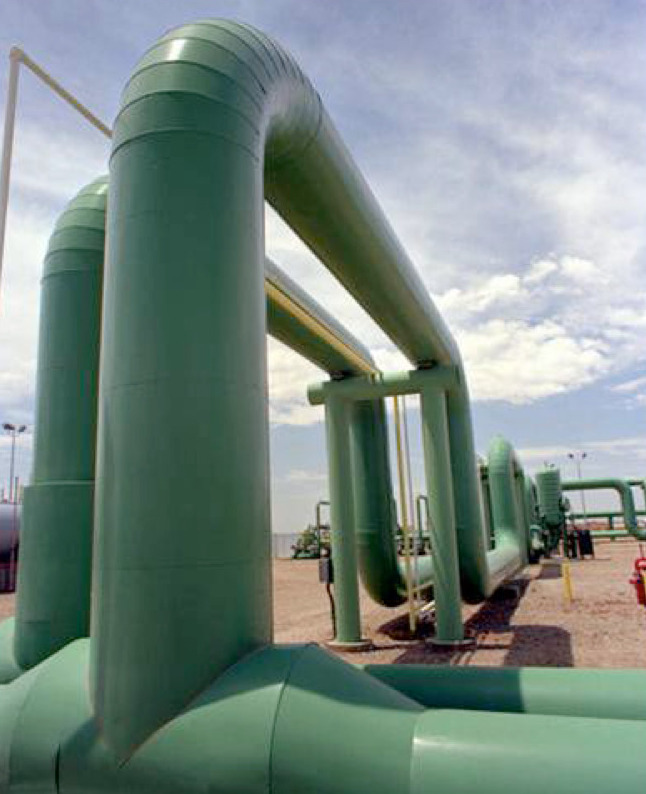
Hydrogen pipelines

A hydrogen infrastructure is the infrastructure of points of hydrogen production, truck and pipeline transport, and hydrogen stations for the distribution and sale of hydrogen fuel, and thus a crucial prerequisite before a successful commercialization of fuel cell technology.

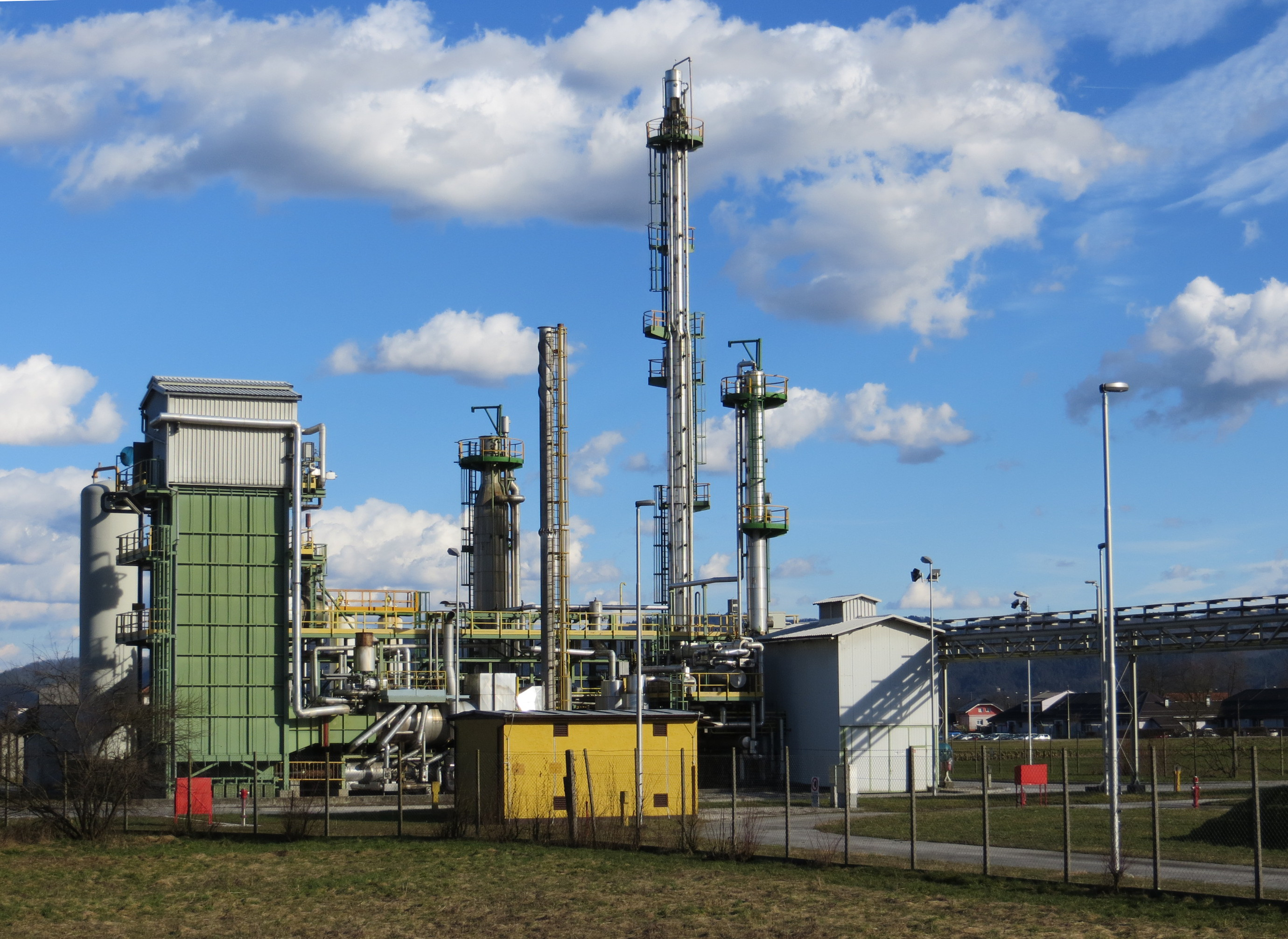
Hydrogen gasification plant for Belinka Perkemija, 2015

Hydrogen stations which are not situated near a hydrogen pipeline get supply via compressed hydrogen tube trailers, liquid hydrogen trailers, liquid hydrogen tank trucks or dedicated onsite production. Pipelines are the cheapest way to move hydrogen over long distances but must be designed to withstand the leakage and steel embrittlement caused by the hydrogen molecule. Hydrogen gas piping is routine in large oil-refineries, because hydrogen is used to hydrocrack fuels from crude oil. The IEA recommends existing industrial ports be used for production and natural gas pipelines for transport, international co-operation and shipping.

South Korea and Japan, which as of 2019 lacked international electrical interconnectors, were investing in the hydrogen economy. In March 2020, the Fukushima Hydrogen Energy Research Field was opened in Japan, claiming to be the world's largest hydrogen production facility. Much of the site is occupied by a solar array; power from the grid is also used for electrolysis of water to produce hydrogen fuel.

== Network ==
=== Hydrogen highways and stations ===
A hydrogen highway is a chain of hydrogen-equipped filling stations and other infrastructure along a road or highway which allow hydrogen vehicles to travel.

Hydrogen stations that are not situated near a hydrogen pipeline get deliveries of hydrogen tanks via compressed hydrogen tube trailers, liquid hydrogen trailers, liquid hydrogen tank trucks or dedicated on-site production. Governments have supported some initiatives to expand hydrogen fuel infrastructure in the US state of California, in some member states of the European Union, Japan and elsewhere.

=== Hydrogen pipeline transport ===
Hydrogen pipeline transport may be used to connect the point of hydrogen production or delivery of hydrogen with the point of demand. According to a 2024 research report, the United States had 1,600 miles (2,570 kilometers) of hydrogen pipelines, and the global total stood at 2,800 miles (4,500 kilometers). The World Economic Forum, in December 2023, however, estimated that Europe had approximately 1,600 kilometers of hydrogen pipelines.

Hydrogen embrittlement (a reduction in the ductility of a metal due to absorbed hydrogen) occurs primarily with 'diffusible' hydrogen, i.e. atoms or ions. Hydrogen gas, however, is molecular (H_{2}), and there is a significant energy barrier to splitting it into atoms.

=== Hydrogen production plants ===
98% of hydrogen production uses the steam reforming method. Methods such as electrolysis of water are also used. The world's largest facility for producing electrolytic hydrogen fuel is claimed to be the Fukushima Hydrogen Energy Research Field (FH2R), a 10MW-class hydrogen production unit, inaugurated on 7 March 2020, in Namie, Fukushima Prefecture. The site occupies 180,000 square meters of land, much of which is occupied by a solar array; but power from the grid is also used to conduct electrolysis of water to produce hydrogen fuel.

== Hydrogen pipeline transport ==
Hydrogen may be transported through pipes.

=== History ===
- 1938 – Rhine-Ruhr The first 240 km (150 mi) hydrogen pipes that are constructed of regular pipe steel, compressed hydrogen pressure 210–20 bars (21,000–2,000 kPa), diameter 250–300 millimetres (9.8–11.8 in). Still in operation.
- 1973 – 30 km (19 mi) pipeline in Isbergues, France.
- 1985 – Extension of the pipeline from Isbergues to Zeebrugge
- 1997 – Connection of the pipeline to Rotterdam
- 1997 – 2000: Development of two hydrogen networks, one near Corpus Christi, Texas, and one between Freeport and Texas City.
- 2009 – 150 mi (240 km) extension of the pipeline from Plaquemine to Chalmette.

=== Economics ===
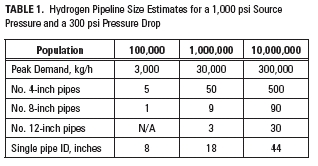

Hydrogen pipeline transport is sometimes used to transport hydrogen from the point of production or delivery to the point of demand. Although hydrogen pipeline transport is technologically mature, most hydrogen is produced in the place of demand, with an industrial production facility every 50 to 100 miles (80 to 161 km)

=== Piping ===
For process metal piping at pressures up to 7,000 psi (48 MPa), high-purity stainless steel piping with a maximum hardness of 80 HRB is preferred. This is because higher hardnesses are associated with lower fracture toughness so stronger, higher hardness steel is less safe.

Composite pipes are assessed like:

- carbon fiber structure with fiberglass overlay.
- perfluoroalkoxy (PFA, MFA).
- polytetrafluoroethylene (PTFE)
- fluorinated ethylene propylene (FEP) .
- carbon-fiber-reinforced polymers (FRP)

Fiber-Reinforced Polymer pipelines (or FRP pipeline) and reinforced thermoplastic pipes are researched.

Carrying hydrogen in steel pipelines (grades: API5L-X42 and X52; up to 1,000psi/7,000kPa, constant pressure/low pressure cycling) does not lead to hydrogen embrittlement. Hydrogen is typically stored in steel cylinders without problems.

=== Infrastructure ===
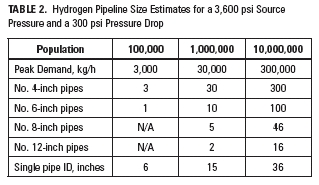

- 2024: USA – 1,600 mi (2,600 km) of low pressure hydrogen pipelines
- 2024: Europe – 1,600 km (990 mi) of low pressure hydrogen pipelines.

== Hydrogen highway ==
A hydrogen highway is a chain of hydrogen-equipped public filling stations, along a road or highway, that allows hydrogen powered cars to travel. William Clay Ford Jr. has stated that infrastructure is one of three factors (also including costs and manufacturability in high volumes) that hold back the marketability of fuel cell cars.

=== Supply issues, cost and pollution ===
Hydrogen fueling stations generally receive deliveries of hydrogen by tanker truck from hydrogen suppliers. An interruption at a hydrogen supply facility can shut down multiple hydrogen fueling stations. A hydrogen fueling station costs between $1 million and $4 million to build.

As of 2019, 98% of hydrogen is produced by steam methane reforming, which emits carbon dioxide. The bulk of hydrogen is also transported in trucks, so pollution is emitted in its transportation.

== Hydrogen station ==
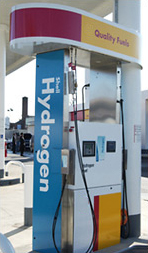
Hydrogen fueling pump

A hydrogen station is a storage or filling station for hydrogen fuel. The hydrogen is dispensed by weight. Two filling pressures are in common use: H70 or 700 bar, and the older standard H35 or 350 bar. As of 2021, around 550 filling stations were available worldwide. According to H2stations.org by Ludwig-Bölkow-Systemtechnik (LBST), as of the end of 2023, there were 921 hydrogen refueling stations globally, although this number clearly conflicts with those published by AFDC. The distribution of these stations is highly uneven, with a concentration in East Asia, particularly in China, Japan and South Korea; Central Europe and California in the United States. Other regions have very few, if any, hydrogen refuelling stations.

=== Delivery methods ===
Hydrogen fueling stations can be divided into off-site stations, where hydrogen is delivered by truck or pipeline, and on-site stations that produce and compress hydrogen for the vehicles.

=== Types of recharging stations ===
==== Home hydrogen fueling station ====
Home hydrogen fueling stations have been offered for purchase. A model that could produce 12 kilograms of hydrogen per day sold for $325,000 in 2019.

Solar powered water electrolysing hydrogen home stations are composed of solar cells, power converter, water purifier, electrolyzer, piping, hydrogen purifier, oxygen purifier, compressor, pressure vessels and a hydrogen outlet.

=== Disadvantages ===
==== Volatility ====
Hydrogen fuel is hazardous because of its low ignition energy, high combustion energy, and because it easily leaks from tanks. Explosions at hydrogen filling stations have been reported.

==== Supply ====
Hydrogen fuelling stations generally receive deliveries by truck from hydrogen suppliers. An interruption at a hydrogen supply facility can shut down multiple hydrogen fuelling stations due to an interruption of the supply of hydrogen.

==== Costs ====
There are far fewer hydrogen filling stations than gasoline fuel stations, which in the US alone numbered 168,000 in 2004. Replacing the US gasoline infrastructure with hydrogen fuel infrastructure is estimated to cost a half trillion U.S. dollars. A hydrogen fueling station costs between $1 million and $4 million to build. In comparison, battery electric vehicles can charge at home or at public chargers. As of 2025, there are more than 70,000 public charging stations in the United States, with more than 200,000 chargers. A public Level 2 charger, which comprise the majority of public chargers in the US, costs about $2,000, and DC fast chargers, of which there are more than 55,000 in the U.S., generally cost between $30,000 and $150,000 for equipment and installation;

==== Freezing of the nozzle ====
During refueling, the flow of cold hydrogen can cause frost to form on the dispenser nozzle, sometimes leading to the nozzle becoming frozen to the vehicle being refueled.

=== Locations ===
H2stations.org tracks global hydrogen filling stations and publishes statistics and a map. They count a total of 980 hydrogen fuelling stations in operation worldwide (including bus stations and non-retail stations) as of the end of 2024.

==== Asia ====
In 2019, there were 178 publicly available hydrogen fuel stations in operation. By the end of 2024, there were more than 550 in operation in Asia, including about 200 in China.

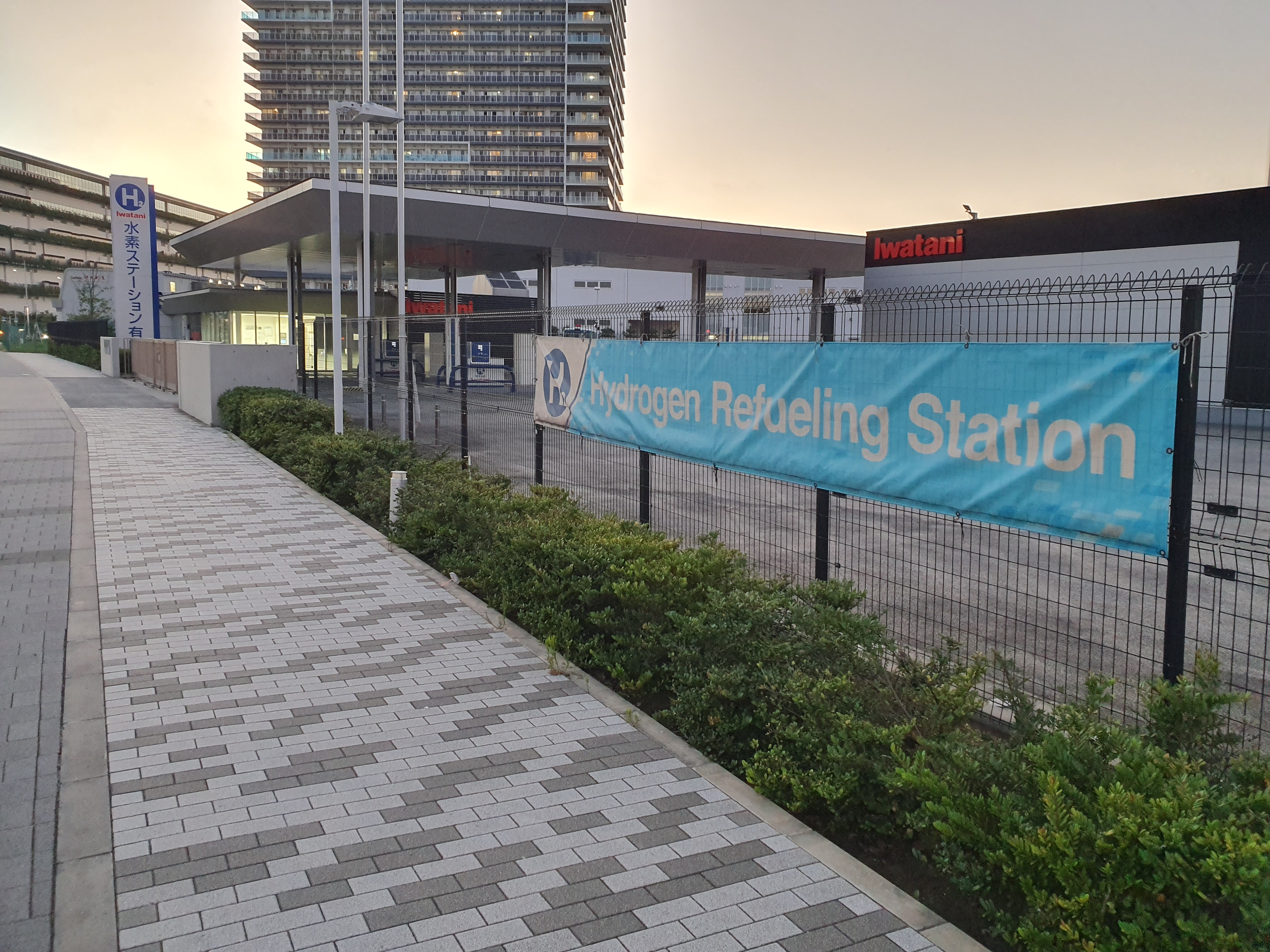
Hydrogen station in Ariake, Tokyo

As of May 2023, there were 167 publicly available hydrogen fuel stations in operation in Japan, Japanese sales of FCEVs fell 83% between 2021 and 2025 to 431 units, as the number of hydrogen stations fell to 149, and many of those do not operate every day; fewer than 10% of people in Japan have access to hydrogen in the evenings as the unprofitable hydrogen infrastructure collapses.

In 2019, there were 33 publicly available hydrogen fuel stations in operation in South Korea. In November 2023, however, due to hydrogen supply problems and broken stations, most fueling stations in South Korea offered no hydrogen. 41 out of the 159 hydrogen stations in the country were listed as open, and some of these were rationing supplies of hydrogen.

==== Europe ====
In 2019, there were 177 stations in Europe. According to H2stations.org, there were nearly 300 hydrogen refuelling stations in Europe by the end of 2024.

As of February 2026, all of the hydrogen stations in Austria had closed. As of June 2023, there were 105 hydrogen fuel stations in Germany, five publicly available hydrogen fuel stations in France, three publicly available hydrogen fuel stations in Iceland, one publicly available hydrogen fuel station in Italy, four publicly available hydrogen fuel stations in the Netherlands, two publicly available hydrogen fuel stations in Belgium, four publicly available hydrogen fuel stations in Sweden, three publicly available hydrogen fuel stations in Switzerland and six publicly available hydrogen fuel stations in Denmark. Everfuel, the only operator of hydrogen stations in Denmark, announced in 2023 the closure of all of its public hydrogen stations in the country. By 2026, however, 40% of Germany's stations had closed, as had three stations in Switzerland.

As of June 2021, there were two publicly available hydrogen fuel stations in Norway, both in the Oslo area. Since the explosion at the hydrogen filling station in Sandvika in June 2019, the sale of hydrogen cars in Norway has halted. In 2023, Everfuel announced the closure of its two public hydrogen stations in Norway and cancelled the opening of a third. In 2024 Shell discontinued its hydrogen fuel projects in Norway.

As of June 2020, there were 11 publicly available hydrogen fuel stations in the United Kingdom, but as of 2023, the number decreased to five. In 2022, Shell closed its three hydrogen stations in the UK,

==== North America ====
===== Canada =====
As of May 2025, there were seven fuel stations in Canada, six of which were open to the public:

- British Columbia: Five stations are in the Greater Vancouver Area and Vancouver Island, with one station in Kelowna. All are operated by HTEC (co-branded with Esso).
- Ontario: One station in Mississauga is operated by Hydrogenics Corporation. The station is only available to certain commercial customers.
- Quebec: The one station in Quebec City is operated by Harnois Énergies (co-branded with Esso).

===== United States =====
As of October 2026, there were 38 publicly accessible hydrogen refueling stations in the US, 37 of which were located in California, with one in Hawaii

- California: As of October 2026, there were 37 retail stations and five non-retail stations. Continued state funding for hydrogen refueling stations is uncertain. In 2023, Shell closed its hydrogen stations in the state and discontinued plans to build further stations. It was reported that "a majority of the hydrogen stations in Southern California are offline or operating with reduced hours" due to hydrogen shortages and unreliable station performance in 2024. and similar shortages were reported again in 2026.
- Hawaii has one hydrogen station, in Honolulu.
- Michigan: In 2000, the Ford Motor Company and Air Products & Chemicals opened the first hydrogen station in North America in Dearborn, MI. No publicly accessible stations remain in operation in Michigan.
- Texas: There is one non-retail station in Austin, Texas.
- Washington: There was one public hydrogen station, in East Wenatchee, until 2025. No publicly accessible stations remain in operation in Washington.

==== Oceania ====
In 2021, the first Australian publicly available hydrogen fuel station opened in Canberra, operated by ActewAGL.

== Hydrogen tank ==
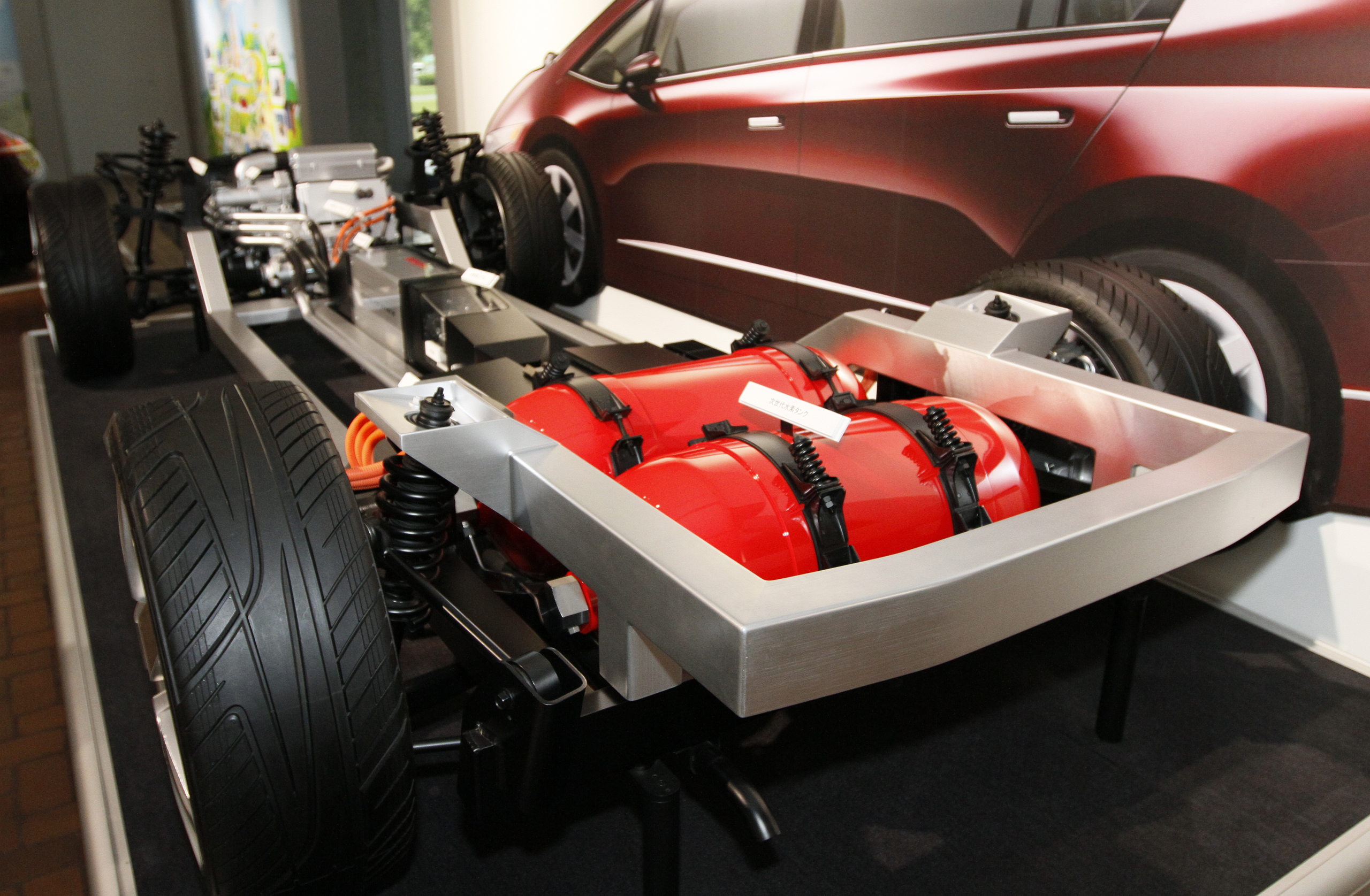
A hydrogen tank on a Honda FCX platform

A hydrogen tank (other names- cartridge or canister) is used for hydrogen storage. The first type IV hydrogen tanks for compressed hydrogen at 700 bars (70 MPa; 10,000 psi) were demonstrated in 2001, the first fuel cell vehicles on the road with type IV tanks were the Toyota FCHV, Mercedes-Benz F-Cell and the GM HydroGen4.

=== Low-pressure tanks ===
Various applications have allowed the development of different H2 storage scenarios. The Hy-Can consortium introduced a one liter, 10 bars (1.0 MPa; 150 psi) format. Horizon Fuel Cells has sold a refillable 3 megapascals (30 bar; 440 psi) metal hydride form factor for consumer use.

=== Type I ===
- Metal tank (steel/aluminum)
- Approximate maximum pressures: aluminum 175 bars (17.5 MPa; 2,540 psi), steel 200 bars (20 MPa; 2,900 psi).

=== Type II ===
- Aluminum tank with filament windings such as glass fiber/aramid or carbon fiber around the metal cylinder. See composite overwrapped pressure vessel.
- Approximate maximum pressures: aluminum/glass 263 bars (26.3 MPa; 3,810 psi), steel/carbon or aramide 300 bars (30 MPa; 4,400 psi).

=== Type III ===
- Tanks made from composite material, fiberglass/aramid or carbon fiber with a metal liner (aluminum or steel).
- Approximate maximum pressures: aluminum/glass 305 bars (30.5 MPa; 4,420 psi), aluminum/aramid 438 bars (43.8 MPa; 6,350 psi), aluminium/carbon 700 bars (70 MPa; 10,000 psi).

=== Type IV ===
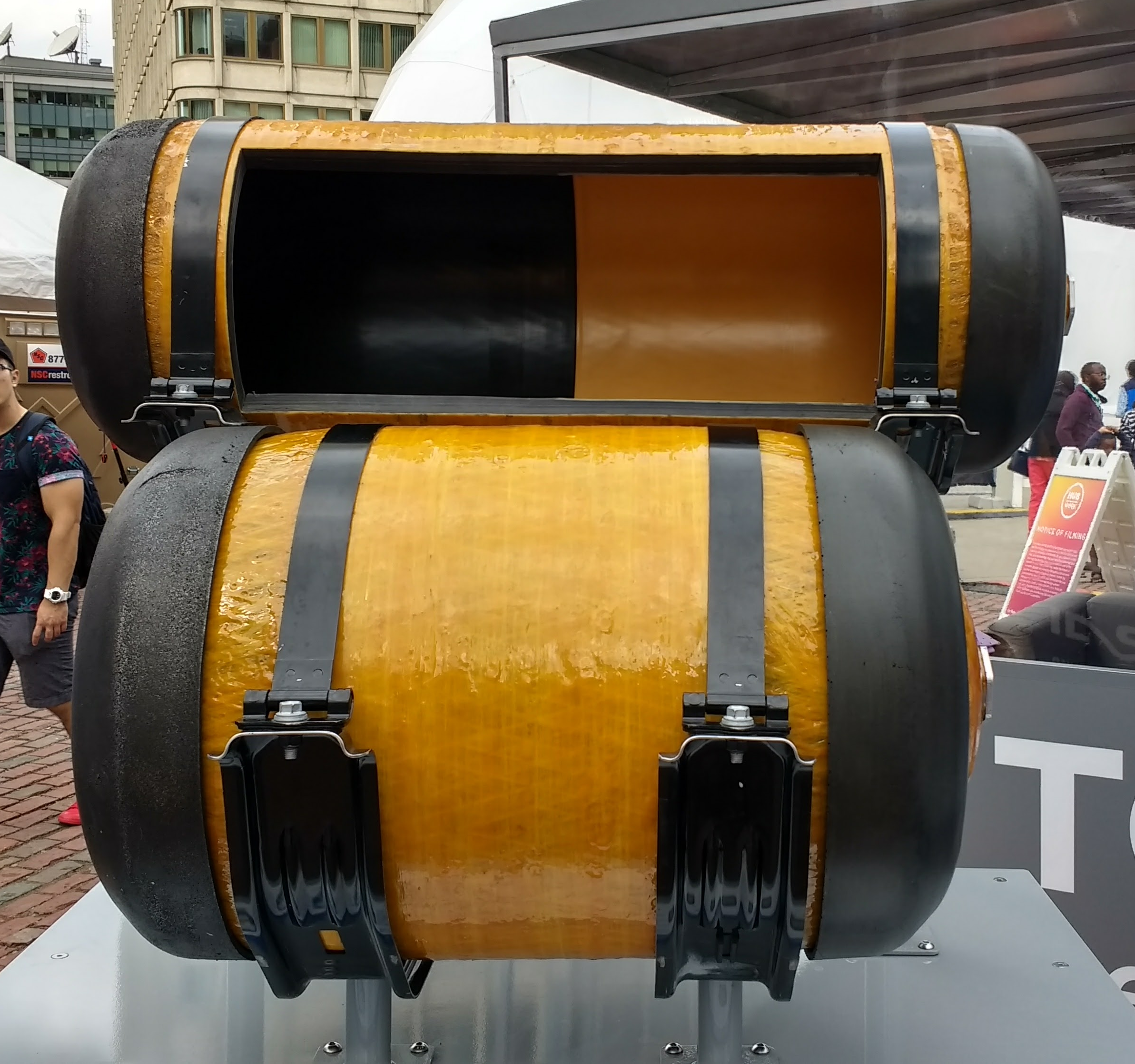
Hydrogen tanks for the Toyota Mirai.

- Composite tanks such of carbon fiber with a polymer liner (thermoplastic). See rotational molding and fibre-reinforced plastic.
- Approximate maximum pressure: 700 bars (70 MPa; 10,000 psi).

=== Type V ===
- All-composite, linerless tank. Composites Technology Development (Colorado, USA) built a prototype tank for a satellite application in 2010 although it had an operating pressure of only 200 psi and was used to store argon.
- Approximate maximum pressure: 1,000 bars (100 MPa; 15,000 psi).

=== Tank testing and safety considerations ===
In accordance with ISO/TS 15869 (revised):

- Burst test: the pressure at which the tank bursts, typically more than 2× the working pressure.
- Proof pressure: the pressure at which the test will be executed, typically above the working pressure.
- Leak test or permeation test, in NmL/hr/L (Normal liter of H2/time in hr/volume of the tank.)
- Fatigue test, typically several thousand cycles of charging/emptying.
- Bonfire test where the tank is exposed to an open fire.
- Bullet test where live ammunition is fired at the tank.

This specification was replaced by ISO 13985:2006 and only applies to liquid hydrogen tanks.

Actual Standard EC 79/2009

- U.S. Department of Energy maintains a hydrogen safety best practices site with a lot of information about tanks and piping. They dryly observe "Hydrogen is a very small molecule with low viscosity, and therefore prone to leakage.".

=== Metal hydride storage tank ===
==== Magnesium hydride ====
Using magnesium for hydrogen storage, a safe but weighty reversible storage technology. Typically the pressure requirement is limited to 10 bars (1.0 MPa; 150 psi). The charging process generates heat, whereas the discharge process will require some heat to release the H2 contained in the storage material. To activate these types of hydrides, at the current state of development you need to reach approximately 300 °C (572 °F).

Another material is sodium aluminium hydride.

== See also ==
- Hydrogen leak testing
- Hydrogen sensor
- Gas cylinder
- Hydrogen compressor
- Liquid hydrogen

== Sources ==
- The Future of Hydrogen. International Energy Agency. 2019.
