= List of fuel cell vehicles =

This is a list of fuel cell vehicles (FCV), or fuel cell electric vehicles (FCEV), that use a fuel cell to power an electric drive system.

For Hydrogen internal combustion engine vehicles (HICEV) see the List of hydrogen internal combustion engine vehicles.

== Cars ==
=== Current ===
Model	Production	Comments
Toyota Mirai (JPD20)	2015–present	Marketed mainly in Japan, California, and Europe. As of November 2021, global sales topped 17,600 units since inception.
Toyota Crown	2023—Present (FCEV)	Marketed in Japan and China only. Also offered with an ICE powertrain.
Hyundai Nexo	2018–present	Marketed in South Korea, California, and Europe.
Honda CR-V e:FCEV	2024–present	A plug-in fuel cell electric vehicle marketed in California and Japan.

=== Discontinued ===
- 2002 - Toyota FCHV — World's first government-certified commercial fuel cell vehicles. Leased in the United States and Japan.
- 2002 - Honda FCX — World's first government-certified commercial fuel cell vehicles. Leased in the United States and Japan.
- 2003 - Ford Focus FCV — Initially planned to be leased across 50 states, it was eventually only leased in California, Florida and Canada.
- 2003 - Nissan X-Trail FCV 04 — Leased to businesses and government entities in Japan and California.
- 2005 - Mercedes-Benz F-Cell (A-Class based) — 100 leased around the world.
- 2007 - Chevrolet Equinox FC — Leased in California and New York.
- 2008 - Toyota FCHV-add — Leased in the United States and Japan.
- 2008 - Honda FCX Clarity — Leased in the United States, Europe and Japan.
- 2010 - Mercedes-Benz F-Cell (B-Class based) — Leased in southern California.
- 2014 - Hyundai ix35 FCEV — Leased in South Korea, California, Europe and Vancouver (sometimes referred to as the "Tucson"). Hyundai claimed this as the "World's first mass production FCEV".
- 2016 - 2021 Honda Clarity Fuel Cell — Marketed in Japan, Southern California, Europe. Total sales 1,900 vehicles.

=== Demonstration fleets ===
- 1996 - Toyota FCHV-1
- 1997 - Toyota FCHV-2
- 1999 - Lotus Engineering Black Cab
- 2000 - Ford Focus FCV
- 2001 - Hyundai Santa Fe FCEV
- 2001 - GM HydroGen3 / Opel HydroGen3
- 2001 - Toyota FCHV-3
- 2001 - Toyota FCHV-4
- 2001 - Toyota FCHV-5
- 2001 - Nissan X-Trail FCHV
- 2004 - Audi A2H2
- 2004 - Mercedes-Benz A-Class F-Cell, powered by Ballard Power Systems
- 2005 - Fiat Panda Hydrogen
- 2005 - Mazda Premacy Hydrogen RE Hybrid
- 2007 - Chevrolet Equinox Fuel Cell / GM HydroGen4 also known as Opel HydroGen4 and Vauxhall HydroGen4
- 2008 - Kia Borrego FCEV
- 2008 - PSA H2Origin
- 2008 - Renault Scenic ZEV H2
- 2008 - Toyota FCHV-adv
- 2010 - Mercedes-Benz B-Class F-Cell
- 2016 - Chevrolet Colorado ZH2
- 2016 - Roewe 950 Fuel Cell (plug-in hybrid fuel cell)
- 2018 - Mercedes-Benz GLC F-CELL
- 2020 - Maxus EUNIQ 7 Minivan
- 2023 - BMW iX5

=== Concept ===
Aetek/FYK

- 2008 - FYK Aetek AS (unknown hybrid)

Alfa Romeo:

- 2010 - Alfa Romeo MiTo FCEV

Audi:

- 2009 - Audi Q5 FCEV
- 2014 - Audi A7 h-tron quattro powered by Ballard Power Systems

BMW:

- 2010 - BMW 1 Series Fuel-cell hybrid electric
- 2012 - BMW i8 fuel-cell prototype
- 2015 - BMW 5 Series GT (F07) eDrive Hydrogen Fuel Cell
- 2019 - BMW i Hydrogen NEXT

Chang'an:

- 2010 - Z-SHINE FCV

Chrysler:

- 1999 - Jeep Commander
- 2001 - Chrysler Natrium
- 2003 - Jeep Treo

Daimler:

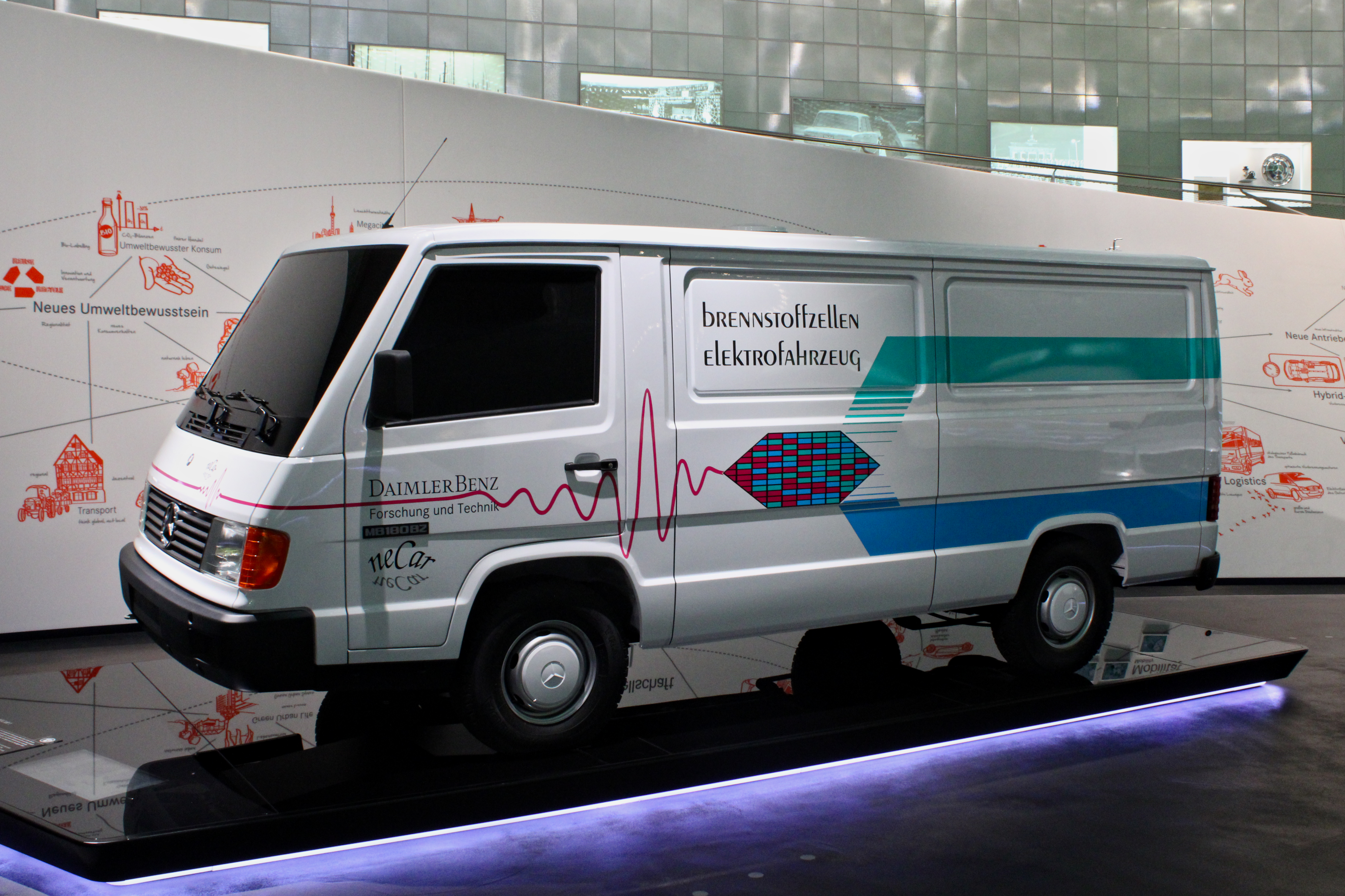
Mercedes-Benz NECAR 1

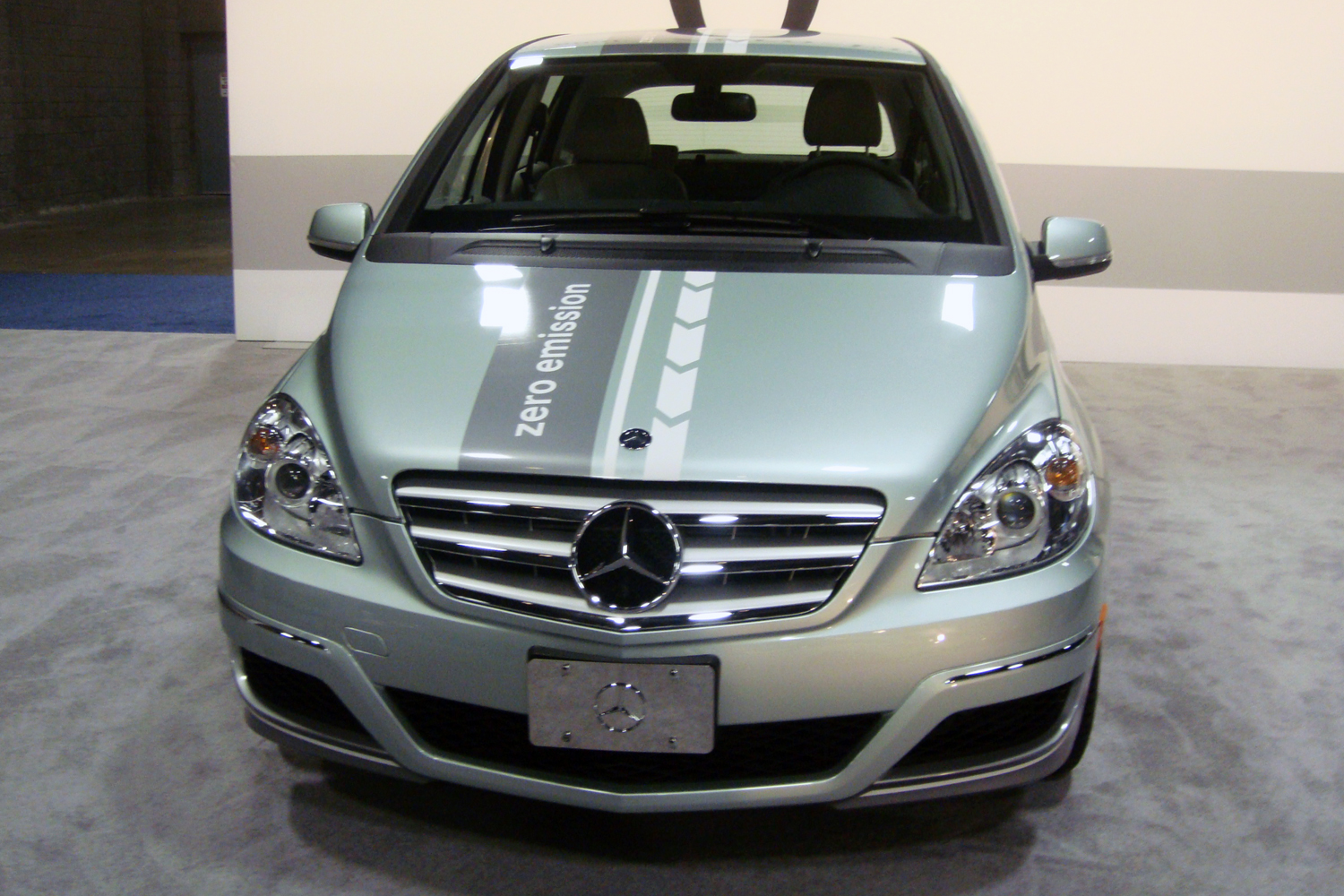
Three Mercedes-Benz F-Cells completed a 125-day around the world drive in 2011.

- 1994 - Mercedes-Benz NECAR 1 based on Mercedes-Benz MB100
- 1996 - Mercedes-Benz NECAR 2 based on Mercedes-Benz V-Class
- 1997 - Mercedes-Benz NECAR 3, 4 (1999) and 5 (2000) based on Mercedes-Benz A-Class
- 2002 - Mercedes-Benz NECAR F-Cell based on the Mercedes-Benz A-Class
- 2005 - Mercedes-Benz F600 Hygenius
- 2009 - Mercedes-Benz F-CELL Roadster
- 2009 - Mercedes-Benz F-Cell based on the Mercedes-Benz B-Class
- 2009 - Mercedes-Benz BlueZERO F-Cell

FAW Group:

- 2010 - FAW Besturn B70 FCV

Fiat:

- 2001 - Fiat Seicento Elettra H2 Fuel Cell
- 2003 - Fiat Seicento Hydrogen
- 2008 - Fiat Phyllis

Ford:

- 2006 - F-250 Super Chief

General Motors:

- 1966 - GM Electrovan
- 2002 - GM HyWire
- 2005 - GM Sequel

Gumpert Aiways Automobile:

- 2018 - Nathalie (uses reformed methanol fuel cell)

Honda:

- 1999–2001 - Honda FCX - FCXV1/FCXV2/FCXV3/FCXV4
- 2002–2003 - Honda FCX powered by Ballard Power Systems - 2002 FCX and 2003 FCX

Hyundai:

- 2005 - Hyundai Tucson FCEV
- 2014 - Hyundai Intrado
- 2022 - Hyundai N Vision 74
- 2024 - Hyundai Initium

Maxus:

- 2019 - Maxus G20FC - multi purpose vehicle (MPV)

Mazda:

- 1997 - Mazda Demio FCEV
- 2001 - Mazda Premacy FCEV (uses Reformed methanol fuel cell)

Mitsubishi:

- 2004 - Mitsubishi FCV

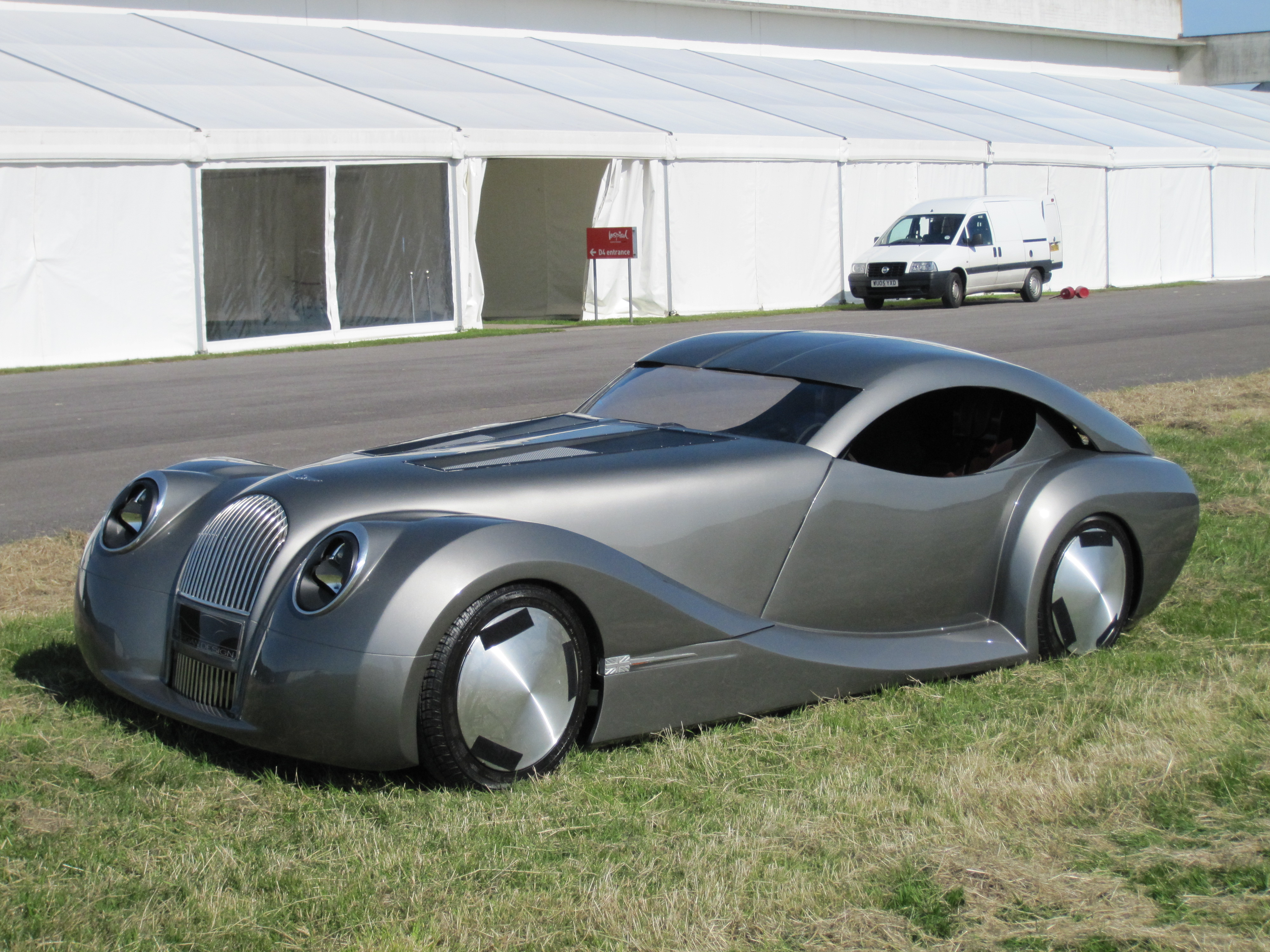
Morgan LIFEcar

Morgan:

- 2005 - Morgan LIFEcar

Nissan:

- 2012 - Nissan TeRRA

Peugeot:

- 2004 - Peugeot Quark
- 2006 - Peugeot 207 Epure

Riversimple:

- 2009 - Riversimple Urban Car
- 2016 - Riversimple Rasa

Ronn Motor Company:

- 2008 - Ronn Motor Scorpion

SAIC:

- 2007 - Roewe 750 sedan FC.

Suzuki:

- 2003 - Suzuki MR Wagon-FCV
- 2003 - Suzuki Wagon R-FCV
- 2008 - Suzuki SX4-FCV

Toyota:

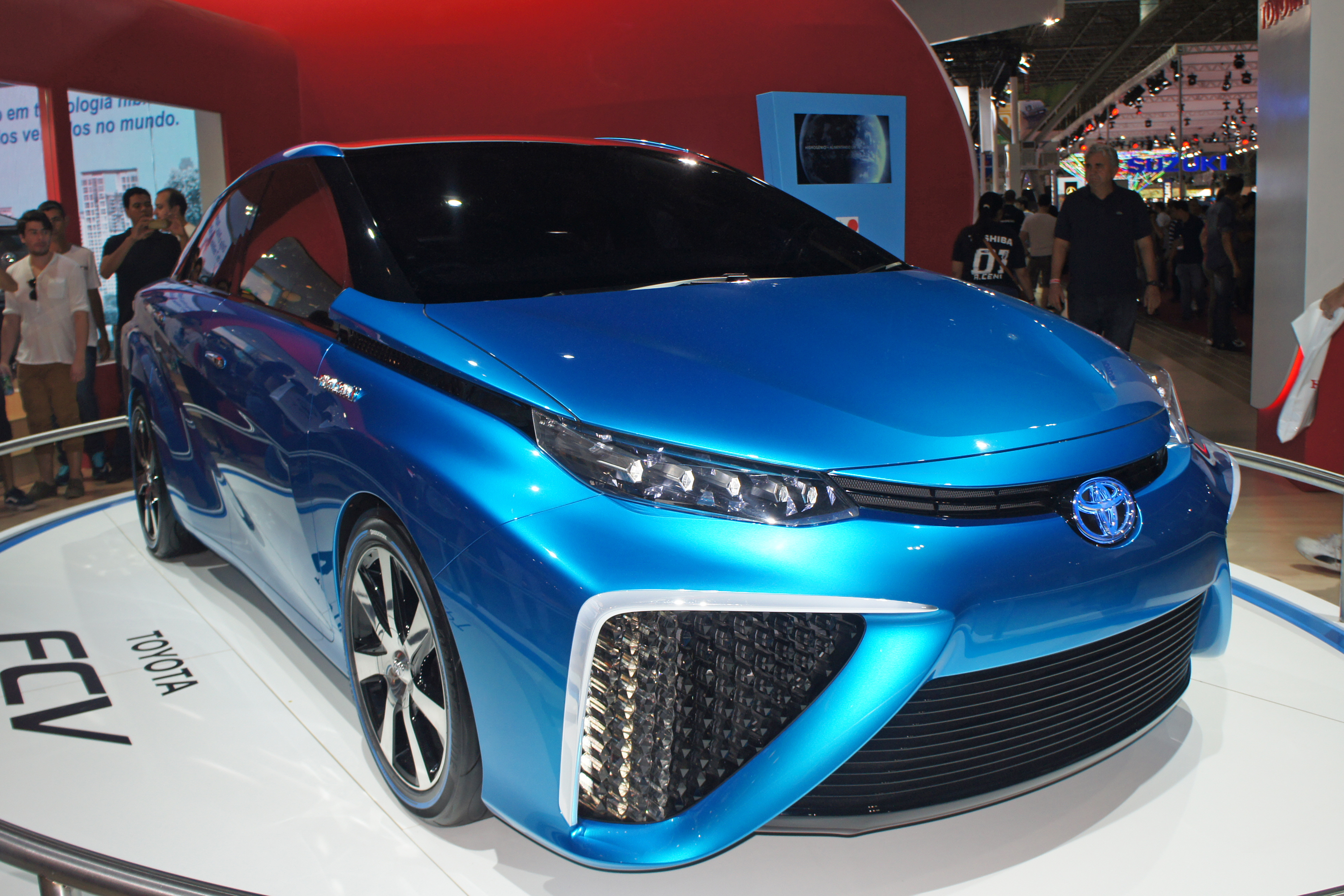
2014 Toyota FCV concept car

- 1997 - Toyota FCHV-1
- 1999 - Toyota FCHV-2
- 2003 - Toyota Fine-S
- 2003 - Toyota Fine-N
- 2005 - Toyota Fine-T
- 2005 - Toyota Fine-X
- 2014 - Toyota FCV
- 2023 - Toyota Hilux FCEV concept two-wheel drive space-cab

Volkswagen:

- 2000 - VW Bora Hy-motion
- 2002 - VW Bora Hy-power
- 2004 - VW Touran Hy-motion
- 2007 - Volkswagen Tiguan HyMotion Fuel Cells
- 2007 - VW space up! blue
- 2008 - VW Passat Lingyu Hymotion
- 2014 - Volkswagen Golf SportWagen HyMotion Fuel Cells
- 2018 - Volkswagen Crafter HyMotion

== Light commercial van ==
=== Production ===
- 2017 - Maxus FCV80 light passenger (plug-in hybrid fuel cell)

=== Concept ===
Daimler:

- Mercedes-Benz Sprinter fuel cell van

== Trains ==
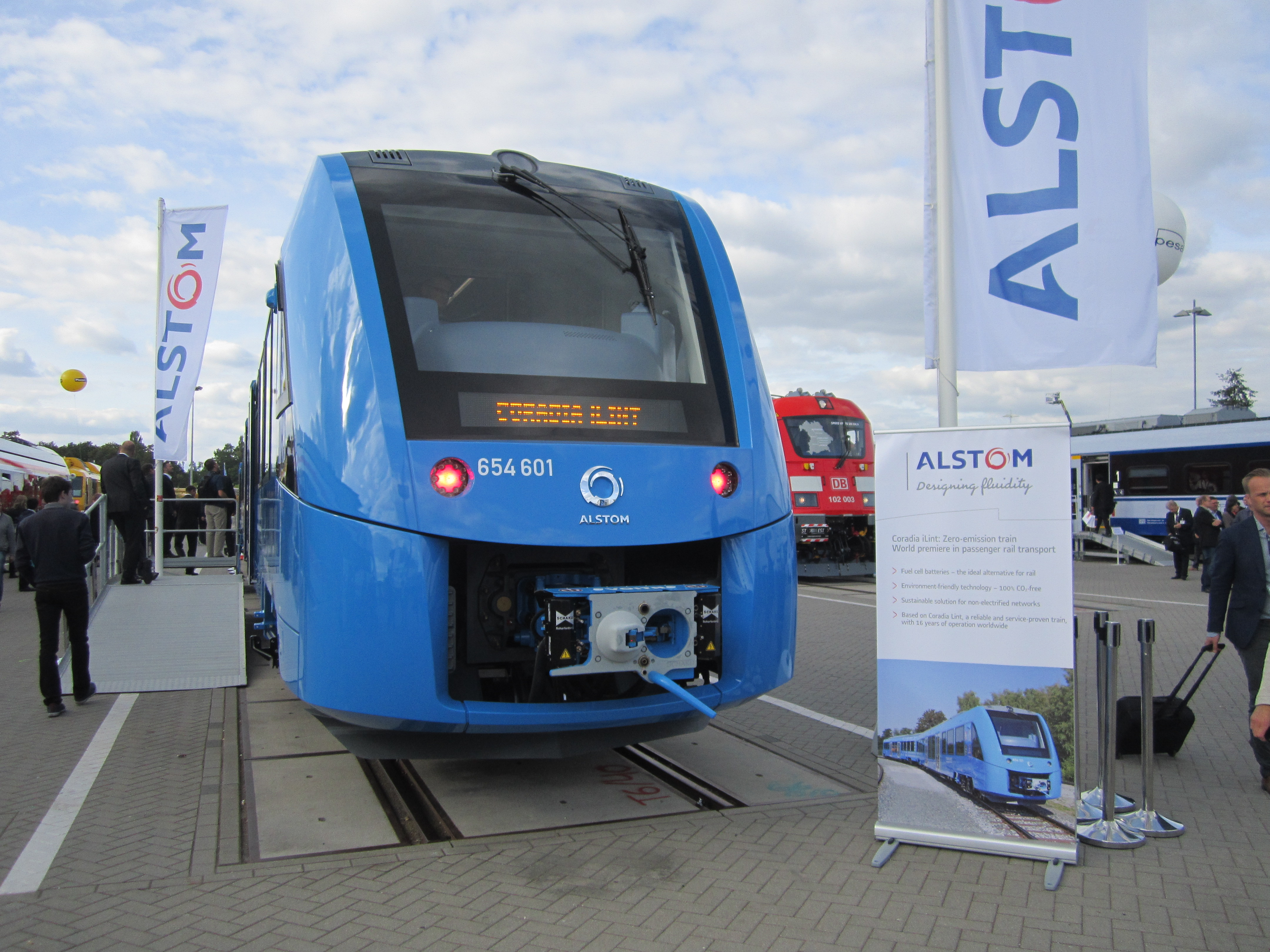
Debut of the Alstom Coradia iLint at InnoTrans 2016

- 2008 - NE Train
- 2009 - Vehicle Projects HH20B
- 2012 - University of Birmingham - Hydrogen Pioneer fuel cell locomotive
- 2015 - Prototype fuel cell powered tram demonstrated by CSR Sifang Co Ltd.
- 2017 - Tangshan - CRRC TRC developed the world's first commercial fuel cell hybrid tram and completed its first test run on Nanhu industrial tourism demonstration operation in 2017.
- 2018 - Alstom - Coradia iLint is the world's only fuel cell passenger train which is put in commercial operation in November 2018.
- 2022 - Pesa - SM42-6DN

== Trucks ==
=== Production ===
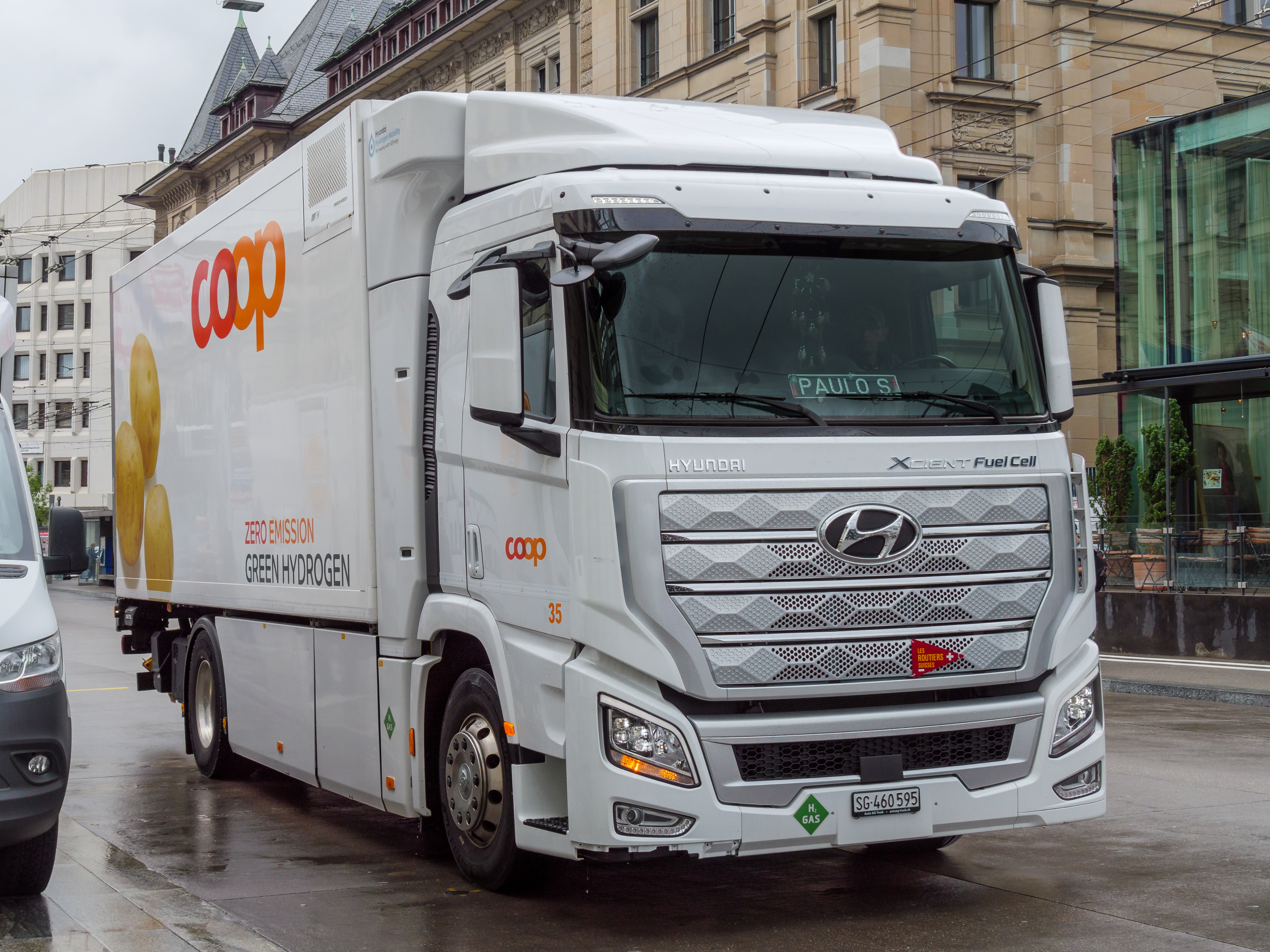
A Hyundai Xcient Fuel Cell truck in 2021

- 2020 - Hyundai Xcient Fuel Cell - world's first fuel cell truck.

=== Demonstration fleets ===
- 2021 – Kenworth T680 FCEV - powered by a Toyota fuel cell (ZANZEFF project)
- 2021 – Hino Dutro light-duty FCET - powered by the Toyota Mirai fuel cell

=== Concept ===
Nikola Motor Company:

- Nikola One
- Nikola Two
- Nicola Tre

== Buses ==
=== Production ===
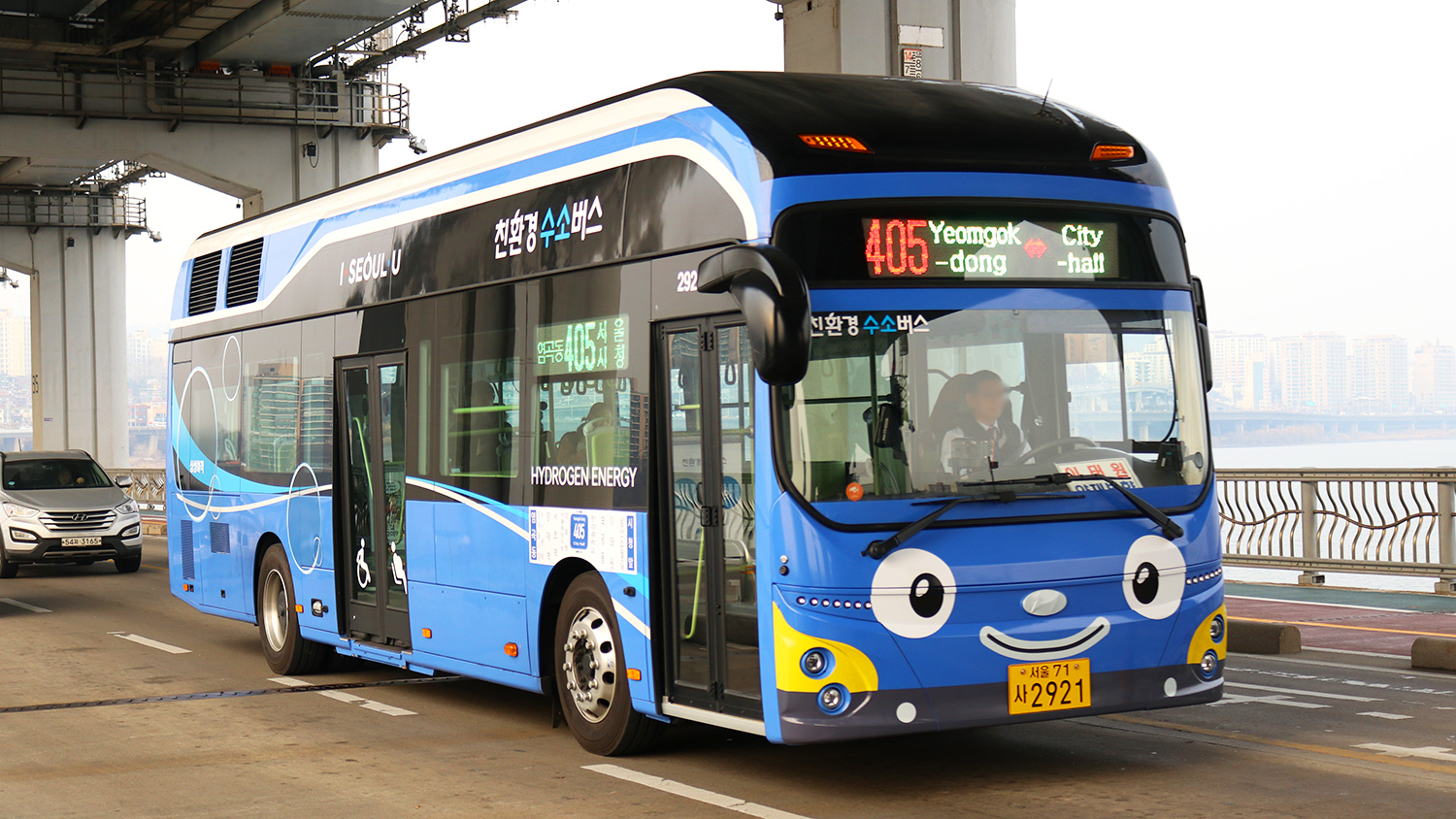
Hyundai's ELEC-CITY Fuel cell electric bus in Seoul, Korea

- 2018 – Toyota Sora
- 2020 – Hyundai Elec City FCEV bus
- 2021 – Solaris Urbino 12 hydrogen
- 2023 – NesoBus
- 2023 – Autosan Sancity 12 LFH
- 2024 – Iveco Bus E-Way H2 (GX 337)

=== Demonstration fleets ===
- 2018 - Sunwin SWB6128FCEV01 (seating capacity 18–24)

=== Concept ===
Daimler:

- Mercedes-Benz Citaro fuel cell bus

Dolomitech

- Minibus A50 16 seats

Ford:

- Ford E350 fuel cell shuttle bus

ISE Corporation:

- FC-London Bus

New Flyer Industries:

- New Flyer H40LFR

Škoda:

- Škoda TriHyBus

Solaris:

- Solaris Trollino 18,75 H2

Tata:

- Tata Starbus fuel cell

Toyota:

- Toyota FCHV-BUS

University of Glamorgan, Wales:

- Tribid Bus

Van Hool:

- A300L
- Van Hool A330 FC

VDL:

- Phileas

Wrightbus:

- Wright Pulsar

== Motorcycles ==
Yamaha:

- 2005 - Yamaha FC-me

Suzuki:

- Burgman 400 ABS, a hydrogen scooter

== Ships ==
- 2000 - Hydra
- 2003 - Duffy-Herreshoff watertaxi
- 2003 - Yacht No. 1
- 2004 - DeepC
- 2004 - Yacht XV 1
- 2004 - Hydrogen challenger
- 2006 - Xperiance
- 2007 - Tuckerboot
- 2007 - Canal boat
- 2008 - Zemships
- 2017 - Energy Observer

Submarines

- Type 212 submarine, Type 214 submarine

== Aircraft ==
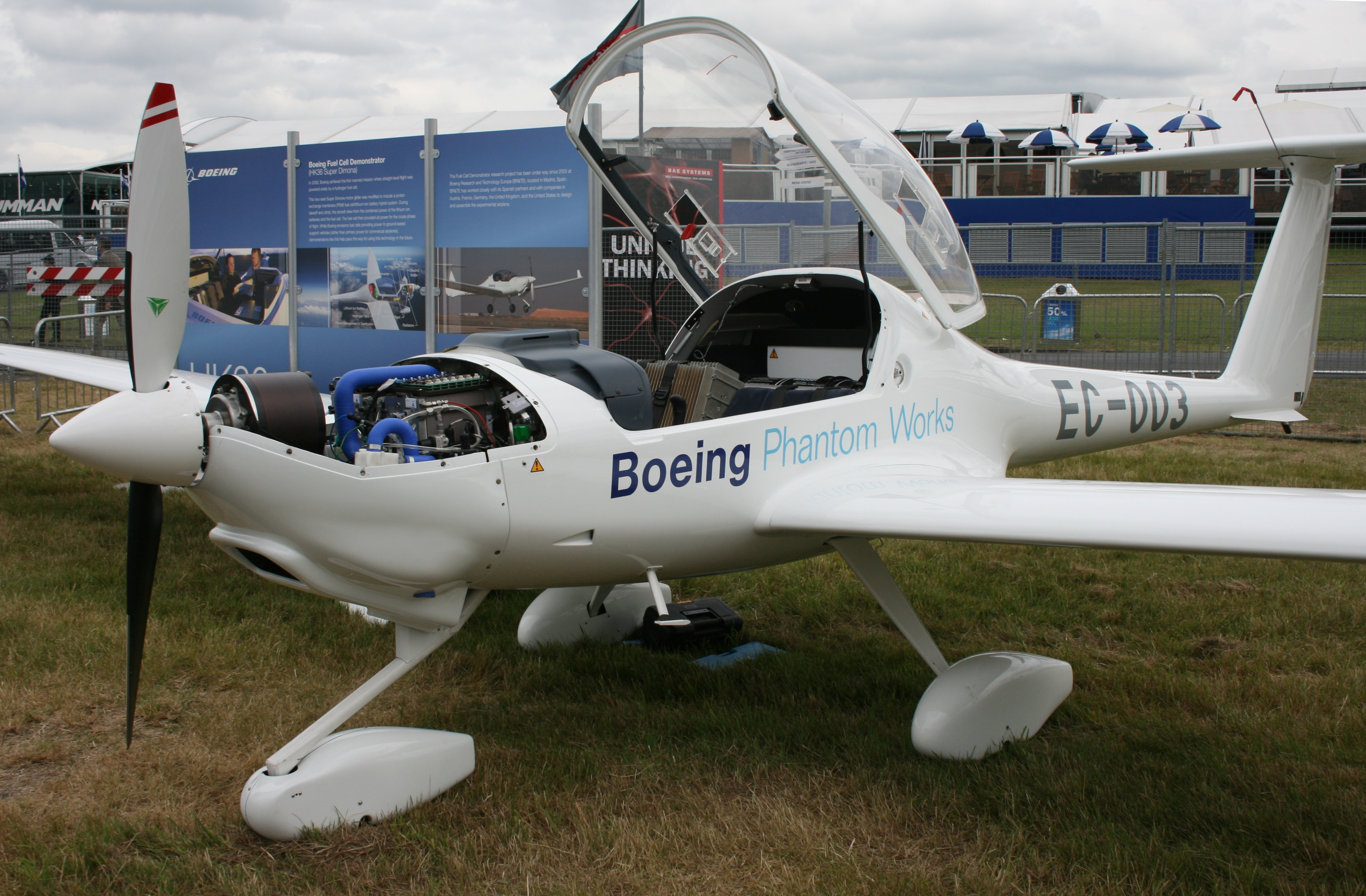
In 2008, The Boeing Fuel Cell Demonstrator achieved straight-level flight on a crewed mission powered by a hydrogen fuel cell.

- 2008 - Aircraft, Boeing
- 2015 - Drone, Intelligent Energy, UK tested successfully Drones with Hydrogen fuel cell engine.
- 2016 - HY4 is the first passenger aircraft in Germany.

== Racing vehicles ==
- 2008 - Element One - fuel cell vehicle - an American fuel cell-powered race vehicle built for the 2008 Formula Zero Championship, the world's first hydrogen race series.
- 2008 - Zero Emission Racing Team - fuel cell vehicle - Belgian team for Formula Zero Racing series.
- 2008 - Forze I - fuel cell vehicle - Dutch team for Formula Zero Racing series.
- 2009 - Forze II - fuel cell vehicle - Dutch team for Formula Zero Racing series.
- 2009 - Buckeye Bullet 2 - fuel cell vehicle - American team for land speed records.
- 2010 - Forze III - fuel cell vehicle - Dutch team for Formula Zero Racing series.
- 2011 - Forze IV - fuel cell vehicle - Dutch team for Formula Student competition.
- 2012 - Forze V - fuel cell vehicle - Dutch team for Formula Student competition.
- 2013 - Concept GreenGT H2 - fuel cell vehicle - French team for 24h of Le Mans.
- 2013 - Concept Forze VI - fuel cell vehicle - Dutch team for CCRC Competition.
- 2016 - Forze VII - fuel cell vehicle - Dutch studentteam which competes against petrol powered cars with a LMP3.

== See also ==
- Timeline of hydrogen technologies
- List of battery electric vehicles
- Energy efficiency in transport
- Vehicular metrics
