= Hugo Spowers =

British automotive engineer

Hugo Spowers in conversation with Silver Donald Cameron about his work.

Hugo Ronald Alan Spowers MBE (born 1960) is a British entrepreneur-engineer who co-ordinated the development of the Morgan LIFEcar sports car project that was launched at the Geneva Motor Show in March 2008, and the Riversimple Urban Car.

Spowers is the founder of Riversimple (formerly known as OSCar), the company that co-ordinated the design of LIFECar, and is currently developing the Riversimple Urban Car, a viable hydrogen fuel cell car for urban use. Spowers is a graduate of the University of Oxford, and Cranfield University.

Whilst an undergraduate at Oxford University in the late seventies and early eighties, Spowers was an active member of the extreme sports society, the Dangerous Sports Club.

Spowers was appointed Member of the Order of the British Empire (MBE) in the 2022 Birthday Honours for services to technology.
