= Hydrogen-powered ship =

Ship fueled by hydrogen

A hydrogen-powered ship is a vessel that uses hydrogen as a fuel source, typically in the form of compressed gas or liquid hydrogen. These ships generate propulsion and onboard power through fuel cells or internal combustion engines adapted to burn hydrogen. As the maritime industry seeks to reduce greenhouse gas emissions, hydrogen is being explored as a cleaner alternative to conventional marine fuels like diesel or heavy fuel oil. Hydrogen-powered vessels produce little to no direct emissions, with fuel cells emitting only water vapor, making them a promising option for decarbonizing shipping. While still in the early stages of adoption, several demonstration projects, ferries, and small commercial ship have already begun operating on hydrogen, and research continues into scaling the technology for larger ocean-going ships.

== History ==
In 2000, the 22-person Hydra ship was demonstrated, and in 2003 the Duffy-Herreshoff watertaxi went into service. 2003 saw the debut of Yacht No. 1, as well Hydroxy3000. The AUV DeepC and Yacht XV 1 were shown in 2004. In 2005 the first example of the Type 212 submarine, which is powered underwater by fuel cells, went into service with the German navy. In 2006 the 12-person Xperiance was debuted, as well as the Zebotec. In 2007 both the 8-person Tuckerboot and the Canal boat Ross Barlow debuted, and in 2008 the 100-passenger Zemships project Alsterwasser went into service in Hamburg. Also, in 2009 the Nemo H2 and the Frauscher 600 Riviera HP went into service. In 2013 the Hydrogenesis Passenger Ferry project went into service.

In February 2020 it was announced that the software tycoon Bill Gates had commissioned the world's first hydrogen-powered superyacht, in a £500m signal of his belief that investment in new clean technology is the best way to cut carbon emissions. Later, the yacht manufacturers refuted this news and claimed that they have no business relationship with Gates.

The custom build was said to be based on blueprints for a 112-metre design "Aqua" publicised in 2019 at the Monaco Yacht Show by the Dutch marine architects Sinot.

In 2023, Norwegian shipping company Norled launched the 82.4-metre MF Hydra, the world's first liquid hydrogen-powered ferry. The 80-car ferry MF Hydra sails in Norway, using 4 tonnes of liquid hydrogen, two 200 kW fuel cells, a 1.36—1.5 MWh battery, and two 440 kW diesel generators. The 80 cubic metre hydrogen tanks and the fuel cell are located on top of the ferry. The hydrogen is trucked from Leipzig in Germany. It sailed as a diesel-hybrid from 2022, and as a hydrogen-hybrid from early 2023.

A wind turbine service vessel bunkered hydrogen in Netherlands in 2022.

In November 2022, Approval in Principle (AiP) was granted by Nippon Kaiji Kyokai (ClassNK) for Kawasaki Heavy Industries's dual fuel generator engine using hydrogen gas as fuel, which will be installed on a 160,000 m^{3} liquefied hydrogen carrier developed by Kawasaki. Kawasaki intends to conduct a demonstration test of this engine after installing it on a large-scale liquefied hydrogen carrier which is planned to be commercialized in the mid-2020s.

In 2023, a 500 kW hydrogen ship sailed in China. This 49.9-metre vessel, powered by a 500 kw fuel cell, has a range of 200 km. It has an 1800 MWh lithium battery. It is known as Three Gorges Hydrogen Boat No. 1.

== Environmental effects ==
In 2010, Hjalti Pall Ingolfsson from Icelandic New Energy has commented that ships are fast becoming the biggest source of air pollution in the European Union. He estimated that by 2020 emissions of sulfur dioxide and nitrogen oxides from ships will exceed land-based emissions in Europe. Hydrogen gas is already widely used in industrial processes and demand for it has increased dramatically over the last fifty years. Nearly all hydrogen is produced using fossil fuels. Six percent of global natural gas and two percent of coal currently goes to producing hydrogen. Hydrogen could be used to power ships with zero emissions from the ship itself, but producing the gas itself is not a low-carbon process if fossil fuels are used to produce it.

== Infrastructure ==
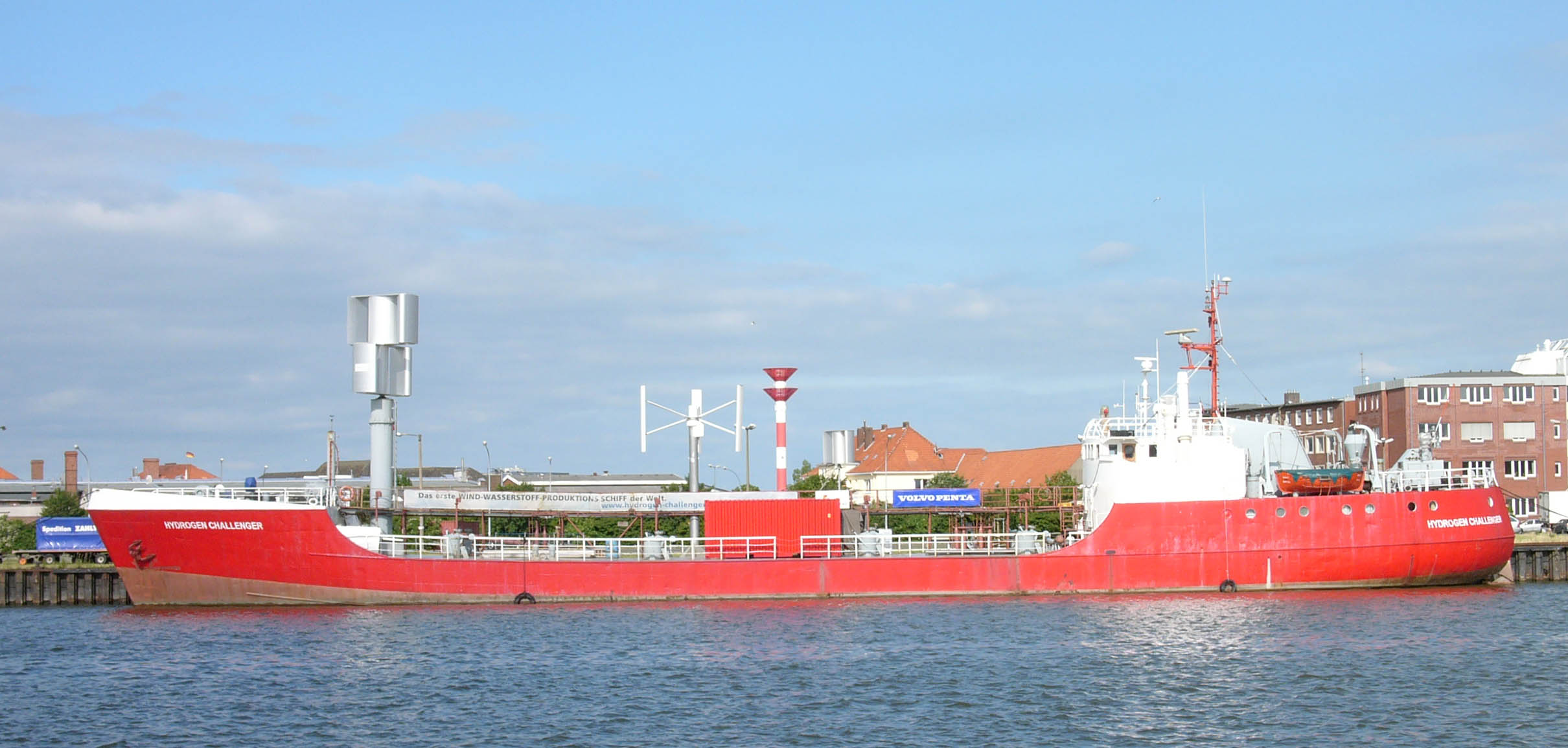
Electrolysis of water ship Hydrogen challenger

A big issue to be dealt with would be the storage of hydrogen on ships, assuming that there would be no opportunity to refill them when out at sea, although one can use wind power and solar panels to generate electricity from the ocean while they are far from the shores and produce hydrogen, either onboard or on ocean-borne stations.

The need for a hydrogen infrastructure varies, where the Yacht No. 1 was fueled by a mobile hydrogen station, the prototype Haveblue Yacht XV 1 was intended to have onboard hydrogen generation, the Xperiance and Tuckerboot have exchangeable high-pressure hydrogen tanks which can be refilled at a local hydrogen station, the canal boat Ross Barlow uses fixed onboard low-pressure solid-state metal hydride storage tanks and depends on a refilling station on the waterside, the Zemships Alsterwasser refills at a fixed waterside storage tank with 17,000 liters of hydrogen which is refuelled by a compressed hydrogen tube trailer. Offshore charging and hydrogen production were under construction in 2022.

== Codes and standards ==
Hydrogen codes and standards have repeatedly been identified as a major institutional barrier to the deployment of hydrogen technologies and the development of a hydrogen economy. To enable the commercialization of hydrogen in consumer products, new model building codes and equipment, as well as other technical standards are developed and recognized by federal, state, and local governments. The Germanischer Lloyd guidelines for fuel cells on ships and boats is used for the Hydra, Tuckerboot, Yacht No. 1, Zebotec and Zemships.

== Research ==
The NEW H SHIP project was a 15-month project that started February 2004. FC-SHIP was funded by the European Commission under FP5 - GROWTH from 2002 to 2004. The Viking Fellowship is a Nordic project. The SMART H2 project started in 2007 by placing a fuel cell in the existing whale-watching ship Elding. Other studies have also considered various ways of combining fuel cell operations on board with air conditioning systems for operations while in harbour. In order to gain a commercial advantage, the Norwegian government scheduled money for a regular hydrogen car ferry in 2016, to be operational in 2021. New rules are viewed as more challenging than developing the technology.

In early 2020, the e5 Project began to design a hydrogen cell and battery powered tugboat.

== See also ==
- Electric boat
- Hydrogen tanker
- Hydrogen train
- Initial IMO Strategy on the reduction of GHG emissions from ships
- MF Hydra
- Wind-assisted propulsion
