= Mercedes-Benz F-Cell =

Daimler AG F-Cell
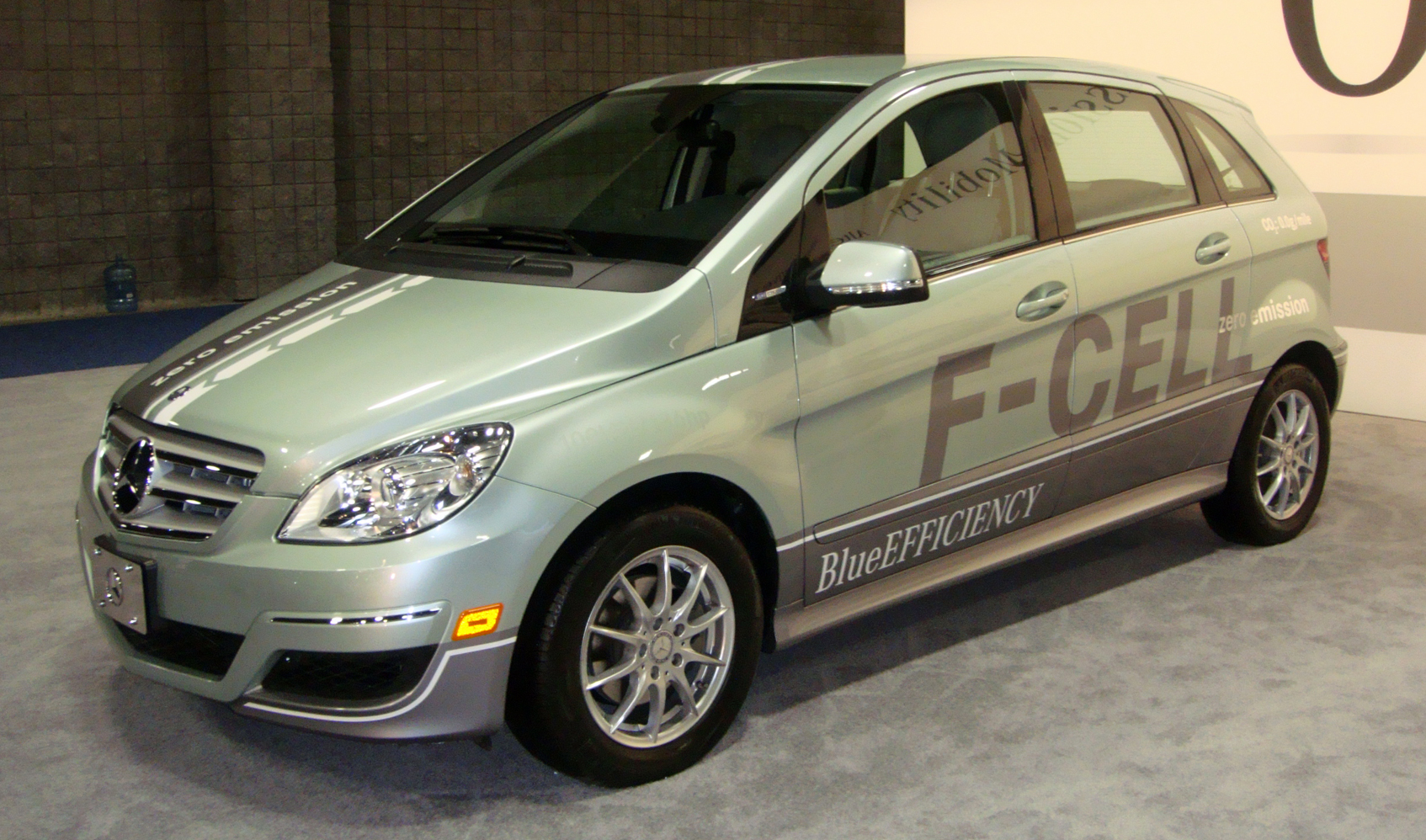

Overview
- Manufacturer: Daimler AG
- Production: 2002 (Concept car); 2010 (B-Class F-CELL)

Body and chassis
- Class: Fuel Cell

Dimensions
- Length: 3,840 mm (151.2 in)
- Width: 1,764 mm (69.4 in)
- Height: 1,593 mm (62.7 in)

The F-Cell is a hydrogen fuel cell electric vehicle developed by Daimler AG. Two different versions are known - the previous version was based on the Mercedes-Benz A-Class, and the new model is based on the Mercedes-Benz B-Class. The first generation F-Cell was introduced in 2002, and had a range of 100 mi (161 km), with a top speed of 82 mph (132 km/h). The current B-Class F-CELL has a more powerful electric motor rated at 100 kW (134 hp), and a range of about 250 mi (402 km). This improvement in range is due in part to the B-Class's greater space for holding tanks of compressed hydrogen, higher storage pressure, as well as fuel cell technology advances. Both cars have made use of a "sandwich" design concept, aimed at maximizing room for both passengers and the propulsion components. The fuel cell is a proton exchange membrane fuel cell (PEMFC), designed by the Automotive Fuel Cell Cooperation (AFCC) Corporation.

There are 60 F-Cell vehicles leased to customers in the USA, Europe, Singapore and Japan.

== Production ==
In December 2010, began its B-Class based F-Cell lease program with the first delivery to Vince Van Patten, with a further 69 to be on the roads in California by 2010.

== Hydrogen storage ==
The 350 Bar (5000 PSI) hydrogen tanks for hydrogen storage contain enough fuel for a 248 mi (399 km) drive. Using 700 Bar (10000 PSI) tanks the range is extended 70% to 421 mi (678 km).

== Notable publicity ==
- On May 23, 2006, Daimler announced that its fuel cell vehicle fleets had achieved a combined mileage of over 2 million kilometers (1.24 million miles).
- On May 31, 2006, Daimler revealed that select individuals in California would be able to take their driving examination in an F-Cell.
- On July 6, 2006, Daimler leased 1 F-Cell to DHL Japan as delivery car in Tokyo area.
- On January 30, 2011, three F-Cell vehicles start on a 125-day long-lasting journey around the world.
- On June 21, 2011, Daimler announced it was moving up commercialization of the B-Class F-CELL to 2014
- On Jan 31, 2014 YouTube video uploaded of new F-cell fuel cell, no information known otherwise.

== Recognition ==
The Mercedes-Benz B-Class F-Cell was selected by Green Car Journal as one of the five finalists to the 2012 Green Car Vision Award.

== Gallery ==
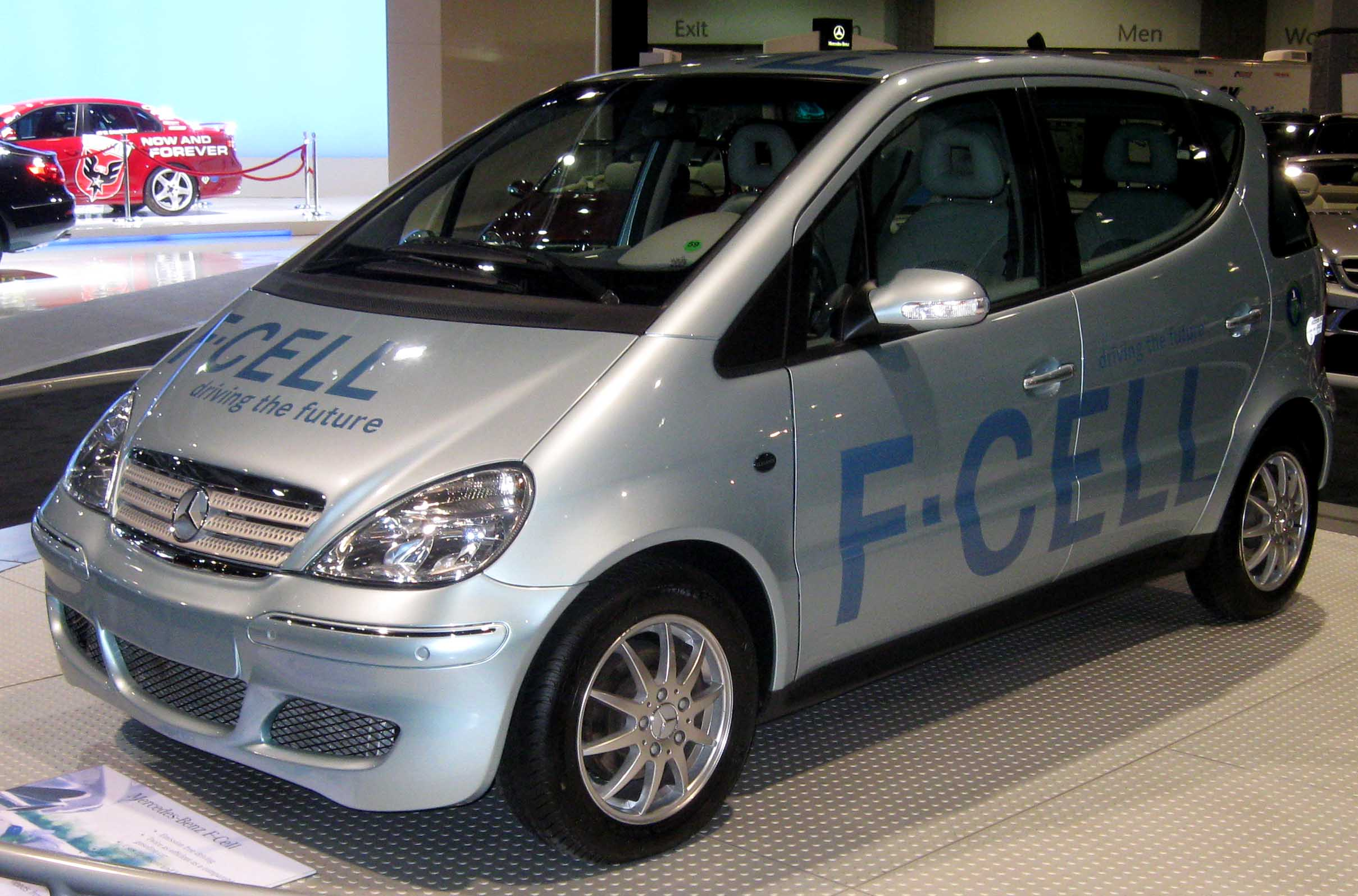
Original A-Class based F-Cell.

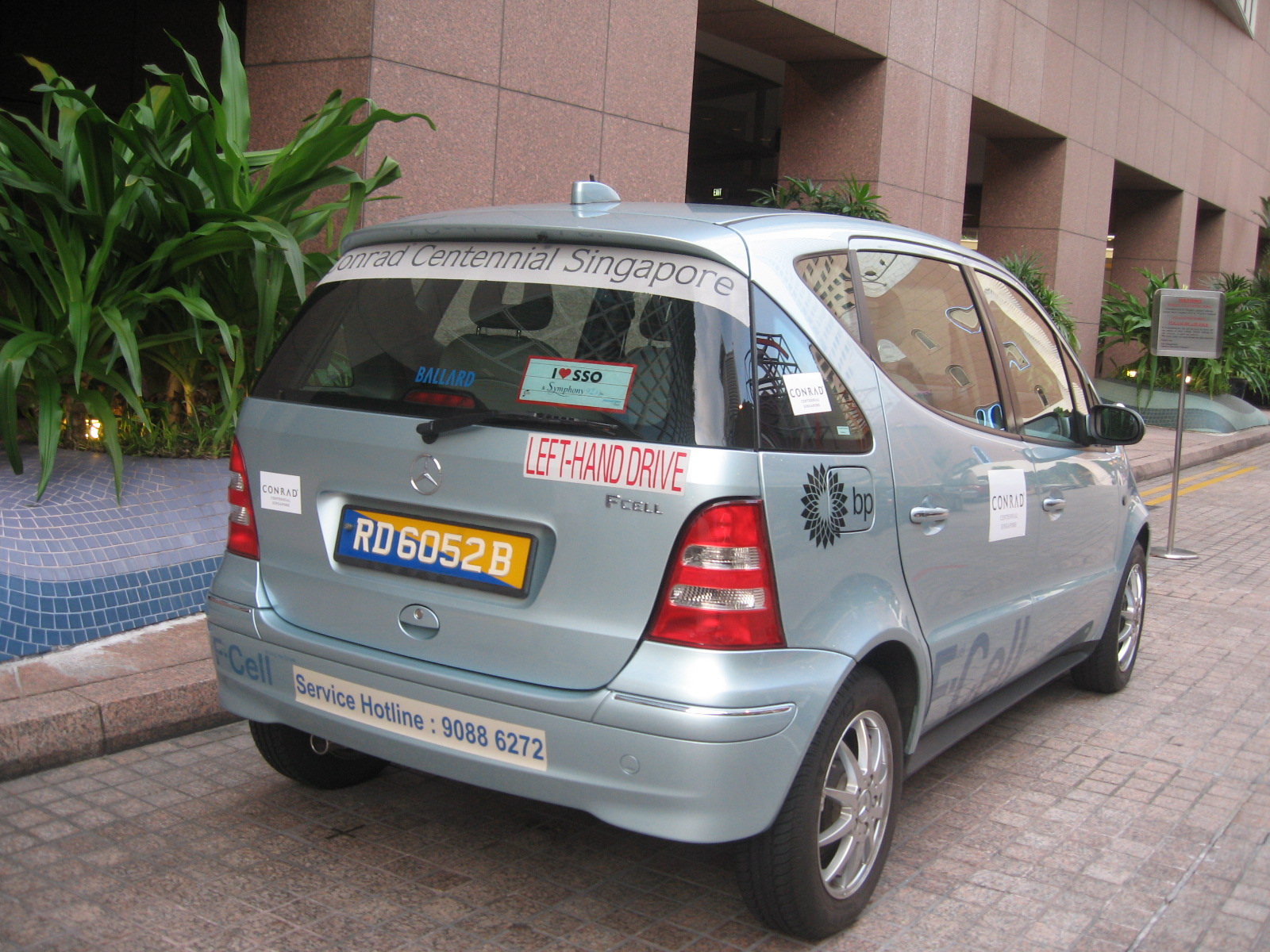
Original A-Class based F-Cell.

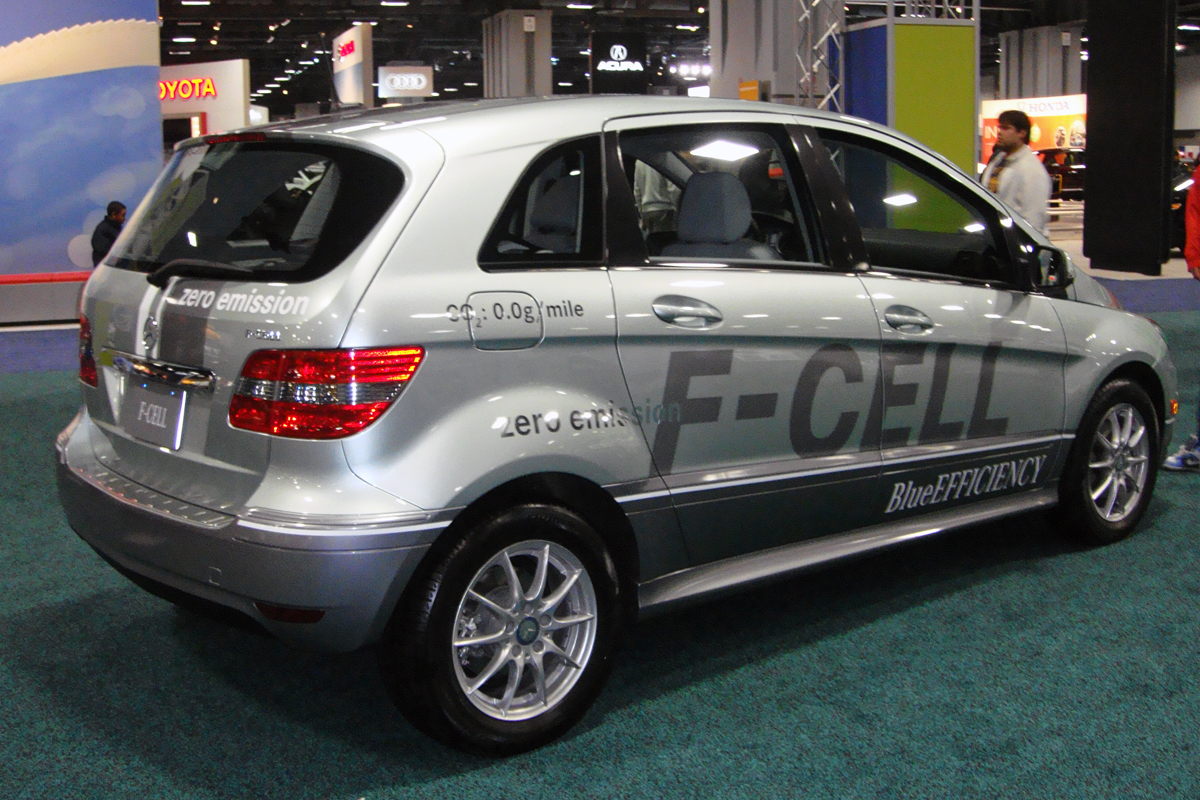
B-Class based F-Cell exhibited at the 2010 Washington Auto Show.

== See also ==
- List of fuel cell vehicles
