= Nemo H2 =

Dutch passenger ship

The Nemo H_{2} is a passenger ship developed by Fuel Cell Boat for 88 people in Amsterdam for which the power for the electric motor is generated by a fuel cell on hydrogen. It is the first boat for 88 people in the Netherlands with a fuel cell. The keel laying was in Hasselt in 2008 and the first boat is in operation on the canals in Amsterdam since December 2009.

== Specification ==
A boat for 87 passengers, 21.95 m long and 4.25 m wide with a depth of 1 meter and a height of 65 cm above the water, an 11 kW electric bow thruster and a 55 cm/75 kW electric azimuth thruster, 6 hydrogen storage tanks with a pressure of 35 MPa for 24 kg of hydrogen, with a 60-70 kW PEM fuel cell and an integrated 30-50 kW battery . The ship has a 9-hour range at a cruising speed of 9 knots. The hydrogen station is powered by NoordzeeWind for the electrolysis of water and has a production capacity of 60 m^{3} of hydrogen per hour which would be sufficient for two cruise boats.

== See also ==
- Hydrogen ship
- Zemships
