= Fiat Panda Hydrogen =

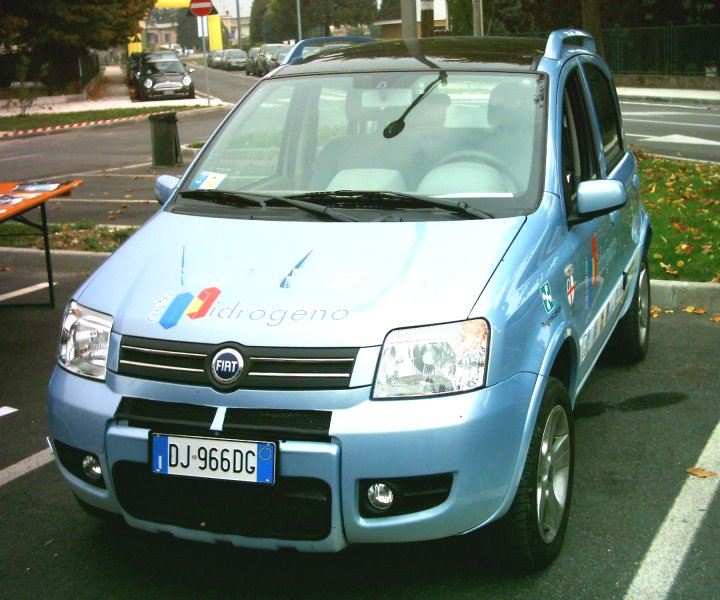

Overview
- Manufacturer: Fiat
- Production: 2005–2010

Body and chassis
- Class: City car

Chronology
- Predecessor: Fiat Seicento Elettra H2 Fuel Cell

The Panda Hydrogen is a prototype fuel cell-type hydrogen vehicle based on the Fiat Panda introduced in 2006.

== Overview ==
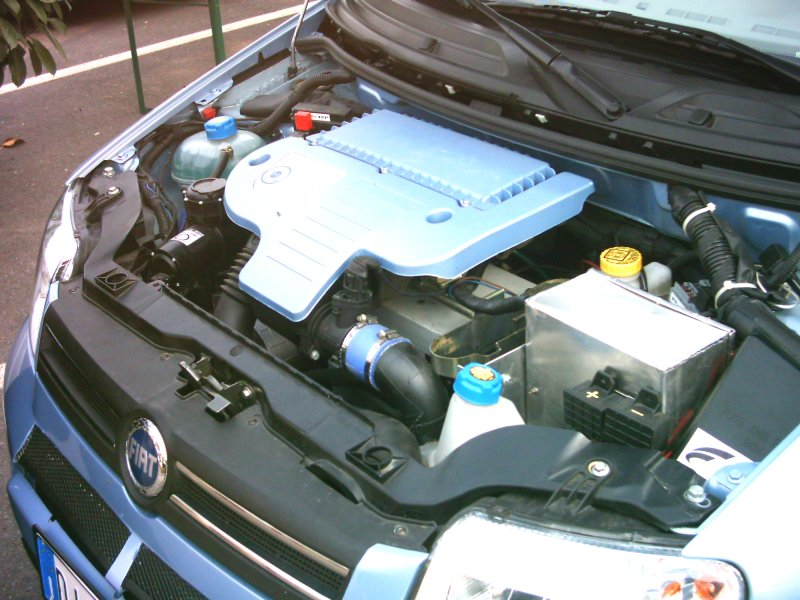
Motor

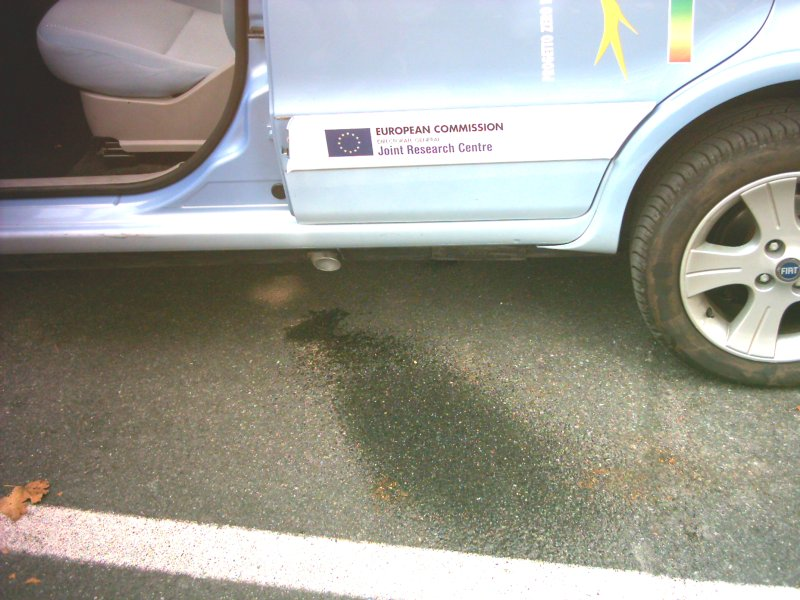
The car produces water vapour as its only exhaust gas

The fuel, gaseous Hydrogen, is stored in underfloor hydrogen tanks at 350 bar. A Nuvera Fuel Cells "Andromeda II" fuel cell stack generates energy to power an electric motor directly, i.e. without a battery. Panda Hydrogen produces 40 kW (54 hp) power and it can achieve top speed of 130 km/h (81 mph). Operating range is over 200 km (120 mi) in urban driving.

=== History ===
In 2001 was introduced first version of Fiats's fuel cell type vehicle Seicento Elettra H2 Fuel Cell, after that came Seicento Hydrogen.

== See also ==
- List of fuel cell vehicles
