= Hydra (boat) =

22 person hydrogen boat

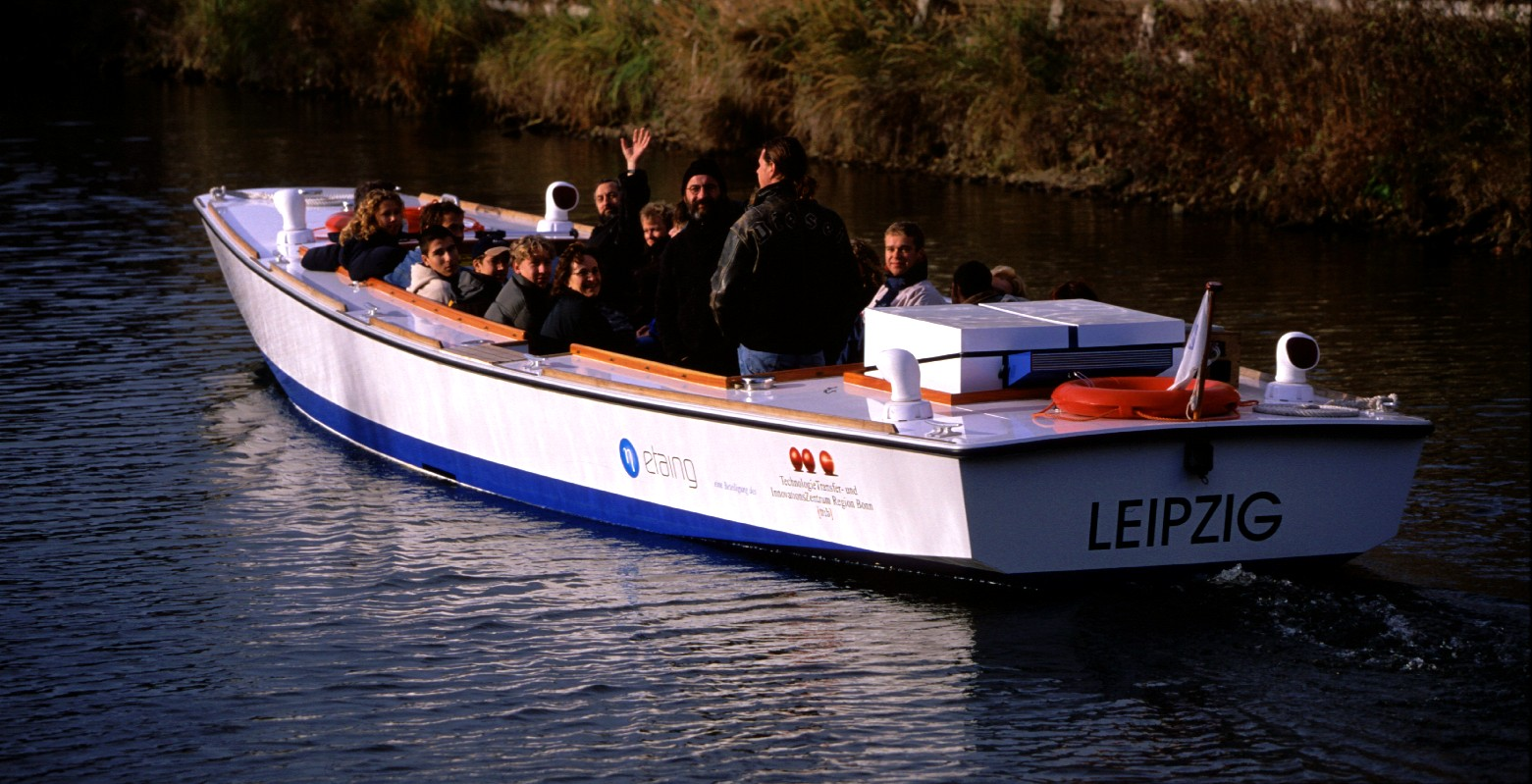
Hydra

The Hydra is a 22-person hydrogen boat, power-assisted by an electric motor that gets its electricity from a fuel cell. Its debut was in June 2000 on the Rhine near Bonn, Germany.

The idea for this project came from Christian Machens in 1999 for designing and building the fuel cell system for the Hydra in Leipzig.

The boat transported around 2,000 passengers in 1999/2000 and was used as a ferry-boat in Ghent, Belgium during an electric boat conference in 2000. It was fully certified by the Germanischer Lloyd for passenger transport, and the fuel cell system had the ability to start even at temperatures below freezing point.

The boat was withdrawn from service in 2001.

== Specifications ==
Boat 12 m long, draft 0.52 m, a metal-hydrid tank for 32 m^{3} hydrogen, 6.8 kW AFC fuel cell, at a speed of 6 kt for 22 passengers.

== See also ==
- Hydrogen vehicle
- Hydrogen economy
- List of fuel cell vehicles
