= GM HydroGen4 =

HydroGen4
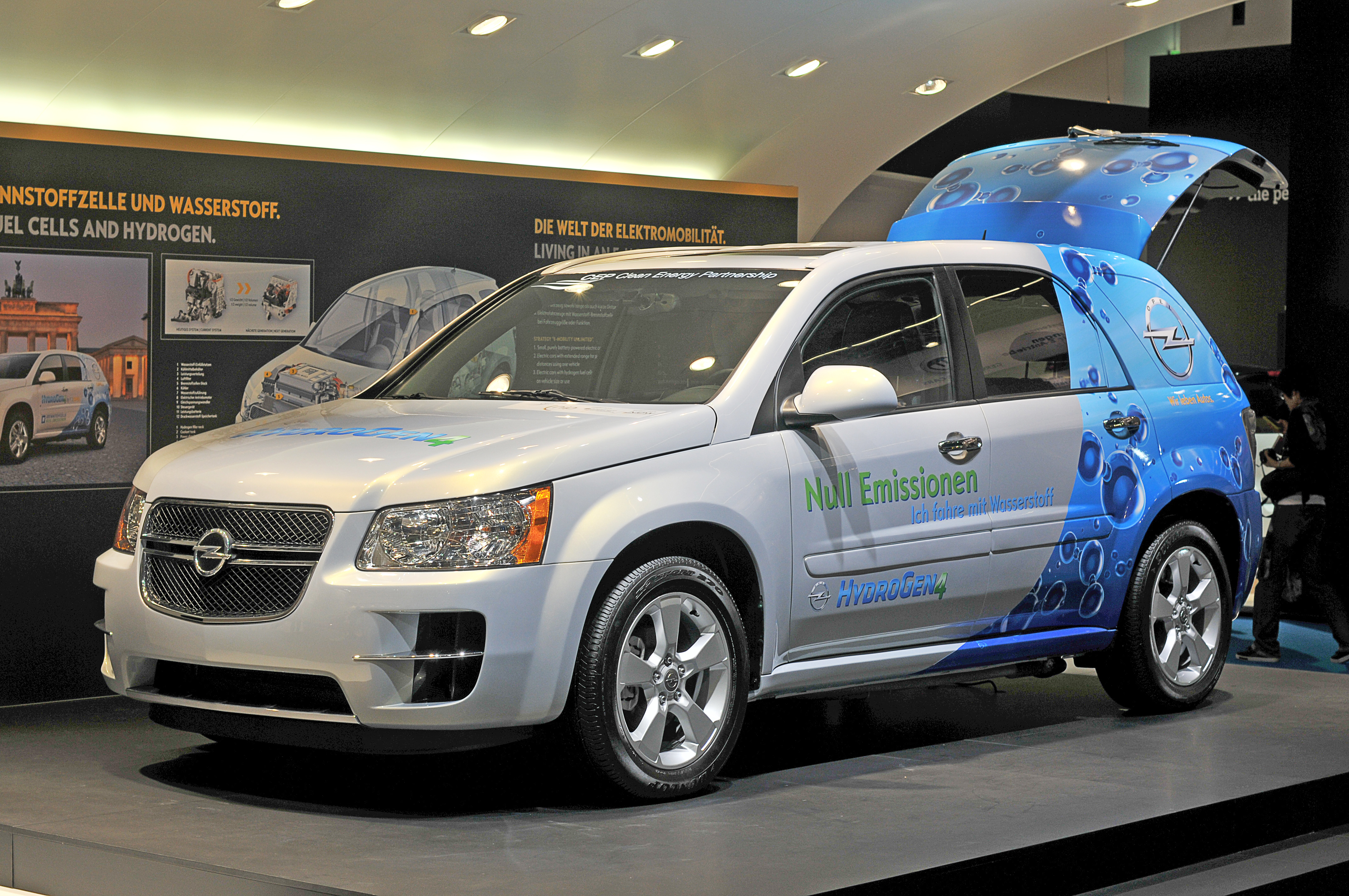

Overview
- Manufacturer: General Motors
- Also called: Opel HydroGen4 (Europe); Vauxhall HydroGen4 (United Kingdom)
- Production: 2008–2010 (>100 vehicles)

Body and chassis
- Class: Mid-size crossover
- Body style: 5-door crossover
- Related: Chevrolet Equinox

Powertrain
- Engine: Fuel-cell with 93 kW

Dimensions
- Wheelbase: 2,858 mm (113 in)
- Length: 4,796 mm (189 in)
- Width: 1,814 mm (71 in)
- Height: 1,760 mm (69 in)

Chronology
- Predecessor: GM HydroGen3

HydroGen4 is the successor of the fuel cell vehicle HydroGen3, developed by General Motors/Opel and presented in 2007 at the IAA in Frankfurt, Germany. It is expected that automotive hydrogen technology, such as the type featured in the HydroGen4, may enter the early commercialization phase in the 2015–2020 time frame.

== Specification ==
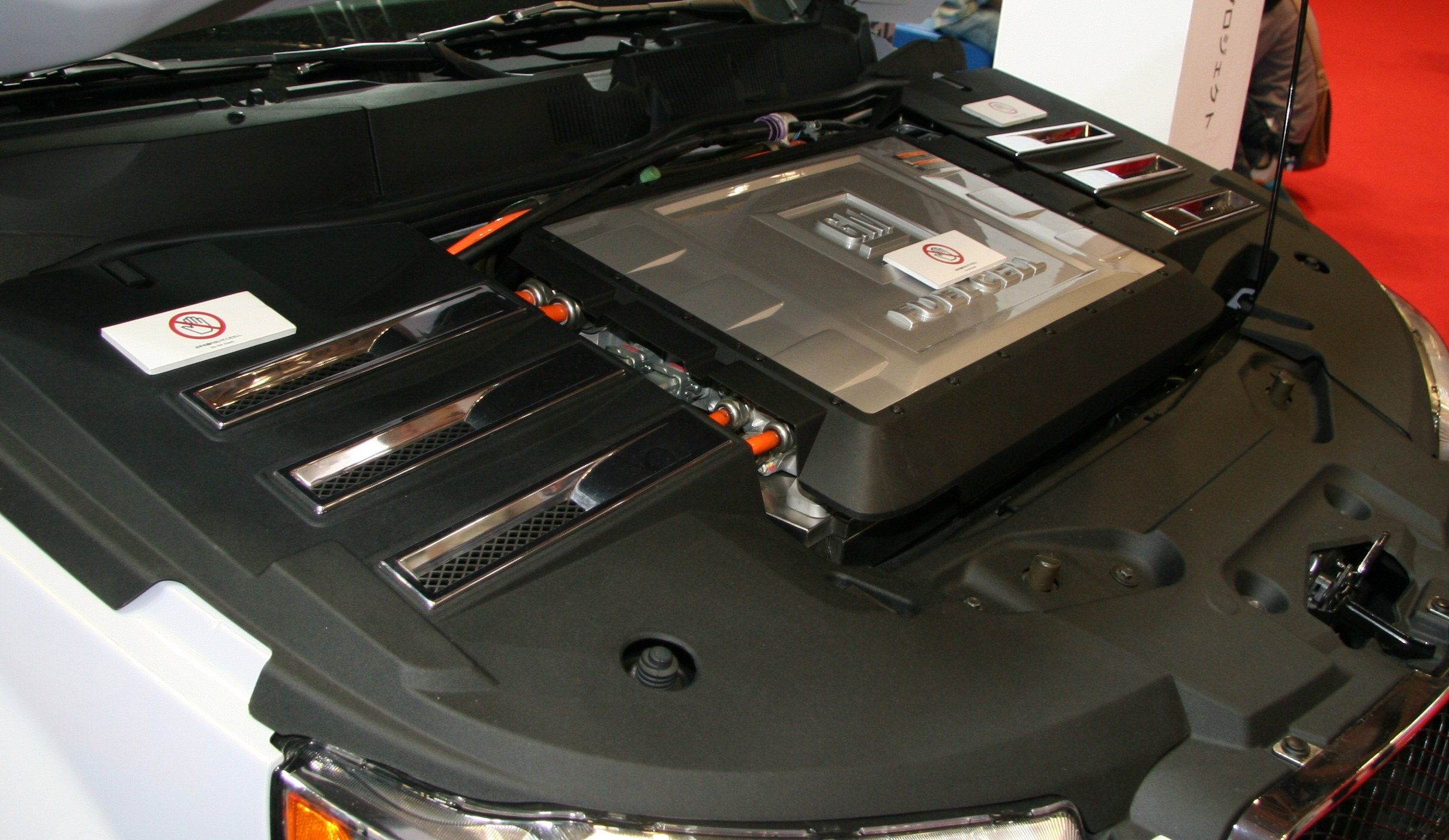
Glance under the hood

The vehicle is based on the Chevrolet Equinox and has a GM fuel cell with 440 cells and an output of 93 kW. The hybrid powertrain also contains a nickel-metal-hydride battery with an energy content of 1.8 kWh/35 kW and a three-phase synchronous motor with 73 kW continuous power and 320 Nm of torque. The peak power of the engine is 94 kW. The hydrogen tanks at 700 Bar (10000 PSI) pressure contain 4.2 kilograms of hydrogen, which last about 320 kilometers (200 mi). The maximum speed is 160 km/h with an acceleration from 0 to 100 km/h in 12 seconds. The HydroGen4 was produced in a batch of 170 pcs from which 10 for the Clean Energy Partnership project in Berlin.

== See also ==
- List of fuel cell vehicles
