= GM HydroGen3 =

HydroGen3
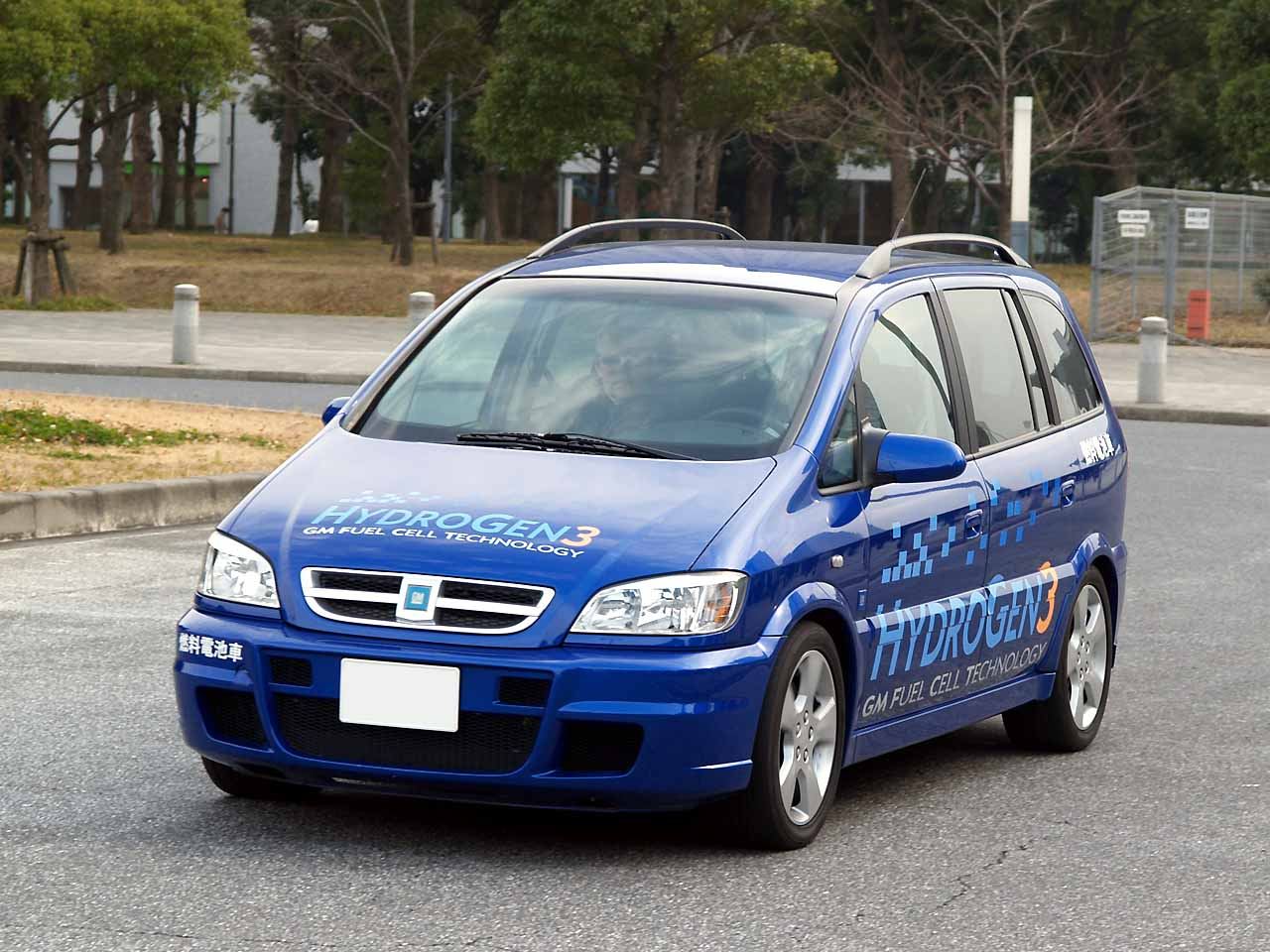

Overview
- Manufacturer: Opel
- Also called: Daewoo HydroGen3 Opel HydroGen3 Chevrolet HydroGen3
- Production: 2001-2006

Body and chassis
- Class: Compact MPV
- Body style: 5-door MPV
- Related: Opel Zafira A (first generation)

Powertrain
- Engine: Fuel-cell with 94 kW

Dimensions
- Wheelbase: 2,694 mm (106 in)
- Length: 4,350 mm (171 in)
- Width: 1,750 mm (69 in)
- Height: 1,685 mm (66 in)

Chronology
- Predecessor: HydroGen1
- Successor: GM HydroGen4

HydroGen3 was an Opel hydrogen fuel cell concept vehicle used for testing in 2006. HydroGen3's 400-kilometer (250 mi) driving range is the highest of any fuel cell vehicle approved for public roads in Japan. The five seater front-wheel driven prototype is based on the Opel Zafira compact MPV.

== Technical specifications ==
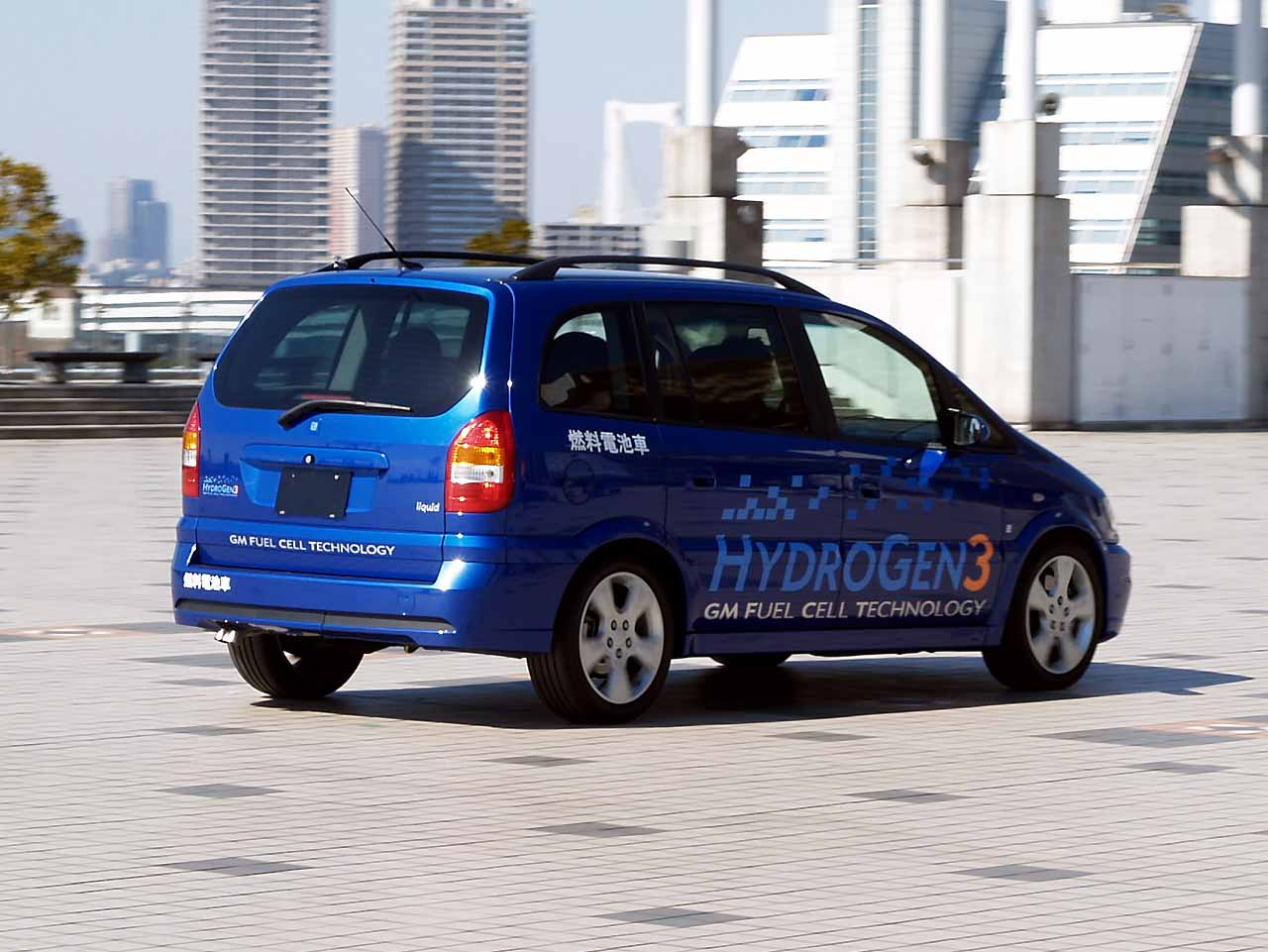
HydroGen3 during the FC Expo 2007 in Japan

- Fuel storage system: there are two hydrogen storage system used:
  1. liquid hydrogen: stainless steel liquefied hydrogen tank, installed ahead of rear axle under rear seat, length/diameter 1000/400 mm, capacity 68 L/4.6 kg, gross weight 90 kg (198 lb).
  2. compressed hydrogen at 700 bar.
- Fuel cell unit: 200 individual fuel cells wired in series, voltage 125-200 V, dimensions: 472×251×496 mm, active area: 800 cm^{2}, pressure: 1.5-2.7 bars, output: 94 kW, power density: 1.6 kW/L or 0.94 kW/kg.
- electric traction system: Three-phase asynchronous electric motor with integrated power electronics and planetary gear, operating voltage: 250-380 V, output: 60 kW, torque: 215 Nm, max. engine rpm: 12000, gear ratio: 8.67:1, gross weight: 92 kg (203 lb), dimensions: 4317×1742×1684 mm, vehicle curb weight: 1590 kg (target value), performance: acceleration 0–100 km/h: 16 s, top speed: 160 km/h (99 mph), operating range: 400 km.

== See also ==
- HydroGen4
- List of fuel cell vehicles
