= Tuckerboot (hydrogen) =

History
- Builder: H_{2}Yacht; WerftAMS Marine Yachten

General characteristics
- Length: 6.76 m (22.2 ft)
- Beam: 2.44 m (8 ft 0 in)
- Draft: 0.54 m (1 ft 9 in)
- Installed power: 2 × 1.2 kW/24 V PEM fuel cells; 24V/180Ah battery
- Propulsion: 2 × 672 W (0.901 hp), 24 V, 28 A electric motors
- Capacity: 8 passenger

A Tuckerboot on hydrogen is an 8-person ship, power-assisted by an electric motor that gets its electricity from a fuel cell. Two boats are operating in Hamburg. The design is based on the AMS Tuckerboot 675.

== Refueling ==
The boats are refueled with exchangeable tanks at the hydrogen station at Hamburg Airport.

== Specifications ==
Boat 6.76 m long, 2.44 m wide, draft 0.54 m, 15 Nm^{3} hydrogen storage tank, with two 1.2 kW/24 V PEM fuel cells, a 24V/180Ah battery, two electric motors (672 W (0.901 hp), 24 V, 28 A each) for 8 passengers.

== See also ==
- Hydrogen ship
- Hydrogen vehicle
- Hydrogen economy
