= Riversimple =

British hydrogen car manufacturer

- Industry: Automobile
- Headquarters: Llandrindod Wells, Wales
- Key people: Hugo Spowers, Chief Executive
- Products: Hydrogen-fueled cars
- Website: https://www.riversimple.com/

Riversimple is a United Kingdom-based car manufacturer of hydrogen-powered fuel cell electric vehicles (FCEVs). It is based in Llandrindod Wells, a town in Wales, where there is a research and development centre and the company's offices. Riversimple was founded by former motorsport engineer and racing driver Hugo Spowers.

Riversimple Rasa

Riversimple claims to align with principles of the Circular Economy, and their mission is: “To pursue, systematically, the elimination of the environmental impact of personal transport.” The company aims to achieve this goal with a “Whole System Approach” – which includes ensuring that the design of the car, materials used, manufacturing, business model and governance all “tread lightly on planet earth.”

Riversimple Rasa next to a Range Rover

The lightness and efficiency of Riversimple’s vehicles is cited as key to their mission. The Rasa Beta, their current vehicle, at 60 mph, uses a 10 kW fuel cell, and produces 13.5 bhp. This means their vehicles use much less hydrogen than other fuel cell vehicles to travel the same distance. The Rasa has a drag coefficient of 0.248.

Riversimple vehicles use a hydrogen fuel cell and supercapacitors in their powertrains. Hydrogen passes through a fuel cell, where it combines with oxygen from the air to produce electricity. This electricity flows to small electric motors in each wheel, which give the car 4 wheel drive. Supercapacitors are used for acceleration, hills and storing recovered energy – regenerative braking. When the car brakes, the kinetic energy normally lost in the form of heat is captured as electricity. As the car slows, this electricity flows into the supercapacitors and is sent back to the motors, allowing acceleration from 0 to 60 mph (97 km/h) in 9.5 seconds.

Riversimple believes in open sourcing their technology, citing working towards the common goal of reducing the environmental damage of personal transport.

The company is currently undertaking real-world beta-testing of the Rasa Beta in and around Abergavenny, and has been working with Pi Engineering Consultancy since 2025.

Riversimple has developed several vehicles:

== The Morgan LIFECar ==
The Morgan LIFECar was an R&D project, run from 2005-2008 and showcased at the 2008 Geneva Motor Show. Part-funded by the Technology Programme (now Innovate UK), this model ran in a test cell which proved beyond doubt that the technical proposition was viable.

== The Hyrban Prototype ==
The 2010 Hyrban was a lab demonstrator designed to prove that a 6 kW powertrain could produce the performance required for urban use and demonstrate the Network Electric Platform in a running vehicle. It was capable of 0-50 mph (80 km/h) in 8 seconds and 50 mph (80 km/h) cruise.

== Rasa Alpha ==
Riversimple unveiled its working 'alpha' prototype, the two-seat Rasa (the name is derived from Tabula Rasa, which means 'clean slate' in Latin) on 17 February 2016. This was the culmination of 15 years of development of the concepts developed and espoused by Riversimple founder, Hugo Spowers.

The Rasa was styled by car designer Chris Reitz, who styled the new FIAT 500. The Rasa Alpha was designed for a range of 300 miles and the equivalent of 250 mpg, with a top speed of 60 mph (97 km/h).

Emissions are zero at tailpipe (just water vapour) and circa 40gCO2/km Well-to-Wheel, if the car is refuelled with hydrogen created using natural gas – the emissions are further lowered if Green Hydrogen is used. Hydrogen refuelling for the Rasa takes around three minutes.

The Rasa Alpha was powered by an 8.5 kW hydrogen fuel cell, and a regenerative braking system, which recovered up to 50% of the braking energy. The vehicle also used a 1.9MJ lithium-ion hybrid capacitor set, providing additional power for acceleration. Electric motors in each wheel produced a combined continuous power of up to 16kW for hill climb and 55 kW peak power.

This model was robust as well as efficient and designed for safety, practicality and ease of use rather than as a powertrain demo. It was designed for EC Whole Vehicle Type Approval (ECWVTA) and used methodical design processes and standards (ISO26262).

The Rasa received international media coverage following the launch in 2016.

== Rasa Beta ==
The company's 'Beta' car features several improvements over its predecessor, with a new fuel cell, motors, wheels, interior equipment and aerodynamics. Safety-critical software, component packaging, air intake and energy management systems are all new. The Rasa Beta also utilises a fully carbon fibre monocoque chassis. The carbon fibre bodywork is made with bio based recyclable composites, and is in line with Riversimple’s goal of circularity.

A number of the Rasa Betas have been tested with the general public, mostly in Wales, and are road legal passenger cars.

A yellow Riversimple Rasa in the countryside in the UK

== ZELLOR Vehicle ==
In April 2026, Riversimple announced grant funding for the £1.7M ZELLOR (Zero Emission Lightweight Long Range) project – part of the UK Government’s £4 billion DRIVE35 programme. ZELLOR will demonstrate a triple balance of range, zero emissions and light weight – a balance which has not yet been delivered by current Zero Emission Vehicle (ZEV) manufacturers, according to Riversimple. Increasingly heavy new vehicles relate to increased, negative, environmental, resource security, safety, and other impacts.

The ZELLOR vehicle will weigh less than 1,000 kg, seat four people and have a range of over 400 miles. This will be the platform for developing Riversimple’s volume production powertrain.

Riversimple is the lead company in the project. ZELLOR vehicle project partners include GreenFlux Motors, TTPi of Nottingham and Pi Engineering Consultancy Ltd.

As of October 2026, the vehicle powertrain – which is using a lightweight Audi A2 mule – is progressing, according to Riversimple: several high performance components, like a fuel cell stack from EKPO and tanks from a Toyota Mirai are being incorporated; Balance of Plant (BoP) and packaging and wiring continue to advance.

== Riversimple Supercar and Coventry University ==
In August 2024, Riversimple announced plans to produce a limited run of hydrogen zero emission supercars with a range in excess of 400 miles, weighing in at just 620kg. At the same time, the company outlined a collaboration with Coventry University on this project.

The collaboration involved a competition with post graduate car design students of the School of Automotive Design to design the exterior and interior of the supercar, which is as yet unnamed.

In February 2025, student Haoyan Bai’s design was selected as the winner. The styling may contribute to the final version of the limited run supercar. Judges included Associate Professor, Aamer Mahmud; Darren Day, Head of Bentley Design and a Coventry alumnus; Ian Callum, former Jaguar design chief; Steve Cropley, from Autocar and Riversimple consultant engineer Jim Router.

== History ==
Riversimple was founded by former motorsport engineer Hugo Spowers in 2001; it became Riversimple in 2007. Until 2014 the head office was in Ludlow, England. Riversimple is currently based in Llandrindod Wells.

Riversimple says their team includes employees with F1, motor racing, yacht design, engineering and automotive design backgrounds.

Hugo Spowers joined a post-brexit trade delegation to China with the then British Prime Minister Theresa May in January 2018, called at the time the “largest business delegation for any British overseas visit”.

In 2020, Riversimple joined the launch of the Milford Haven: Energy Kingdom in Pembrokeshire, an initiative in the Port of Milford Haven to demonstrate decarbonisation with a ‘smart local energy system.’ The £4.5 million project was completed in 2022 and utilised two Riversimple Rasas as a feasibility study, which refueled with green hydrogen made in Milford Haven with electrolysers.

In 2021, Riversimple signed the Terra Carta, a guiding charter which is part of the Sustainable Markets Initiative. Riversimple is an associate of the Sustainable Markets Initiative, which was launched by King Charles III (then Prince of Wales) in 2020 as the ‘world’s go-to private sector organization for sustainable transition.’

Riversimple Rasa driving into Buckingham Palace

Also in 2021, King Charles III, then the Prince of Wales, visited the Riversimple headquarters in Wales and drove a Rasa. Riversimple is featured on RE:TV in “Reinventing Electric Vehicles," a short film launched in 2023. RE:TV is an affiliated media organisation of the Sustainable Markets Initiative.

In 2021, Riversimple founder Hugo Spowers was awarded an MBE for services to Technology by the late Queen Elizabeth II.

In 2023, three Riversimple Rasas completed the London to Paris EV Rally.

In the summer of 2025, Riversimple collaborated with green hydrogen company Engas – Engas founder Amitava Roy used a Rasa vehicle as a daily car, refuelling at an Engas refueler on a farm in Steyning, West Sussex, suggesting this proved accessible and inexpensive green hydrogen refuelling.

== Investment ==
In 2015, Riversimple received £2 million from the Welsh Government to develop the Rasa. In 2017 and 2018, £2.6 million was raised through crowdfunding by the company, to match €2m European FCHJU SWARM grant funding. A further £1.5 million was raised in 2021. The company has also received a number of innovation and technical grants from Innovate UK and others.

== Business model ==
The company states that they plan on providing their vehicles via a Mobility-as-a-Service model, under which users have use of a Riversimple vehicle for a monthly fee, which covers road tax, insurance, fuel and maintenance costs. Currently, no Riversimple vehicles are available, but beta-testers have been trialing the service with Rasas.

Riversimple states that the Mobility-as-a-Service model incentivises them to make cars that last longer, are more efficient, use fewer critical resources and to maximise recovery at the end of the vehicle's life.

Though the UK hydrogen refuelling infrastructure is in its infancy, Riversimple's model sees the company initially supplying their vehicles in the vicinity of hydrogen refuelling facilities. Riversimple has collaborated with several hydrogen refuellers and producers like Element 2 and Engas.

== Governance ==
Riversimple’s governance model is termed the Future Guardian Governance™ model and has six Custodian Companies that represent key stakeholder groups equally – Customers, Investors, Staff, Environment, Community, and Commercial partners.

The governance model has been praised for its radically different structure, including in EY’s New Business Unit report, with recognition from the UKGBC.

Juergen Maier CBE, who was Chief Executive of Siemens UK, served as Riversimple's Commercial Partners Custodian and subsequently a board director before he took the role as Chairman of Great British Energy.
