= Ross Barlow =

Canal boat powered by hybrid hydrogen engine

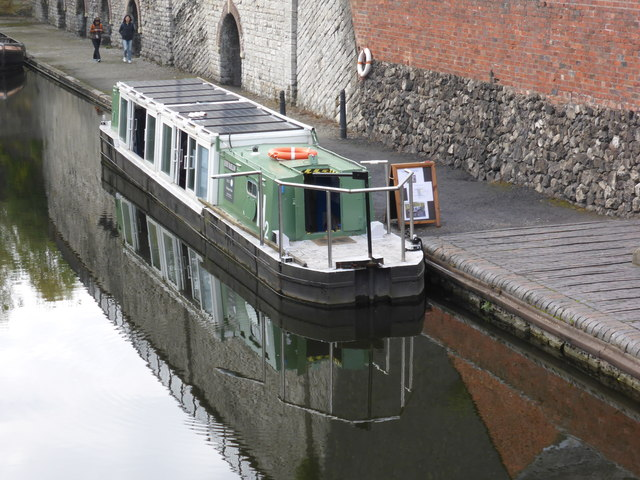
- At the Black Country Living Museum in 2014

History
- Launched: 21 September 2007

General characteristics
- Type: Narrow boat
- Installed power: hybrid hydrogen fuel cell
- Propulsion: Permanent magnet brushed DC electric motor

The canal boat Ross Barlow is a hybrid hydrogen narrowboat, power-assisted by an electric motor whose electricity is supplied by a fuel cell or a battery. It debuted on 21 September 2007.

== History ==
The Protium Project at the University of Birmingham started at the beginning of 2006. The boat is named in memory of a postgraduate student who was killed in a hang gliding accident in March 2005 at the age of 25. He had worked on the project in its early stages and was an enthusiastic supporter of sustainable energy.

== Refueling ==
The fixed tanks are refuelled at a waterway hydrogen station. The hydrogen is generated by electrolysis using solar or wind turbines.

== Specifications ==
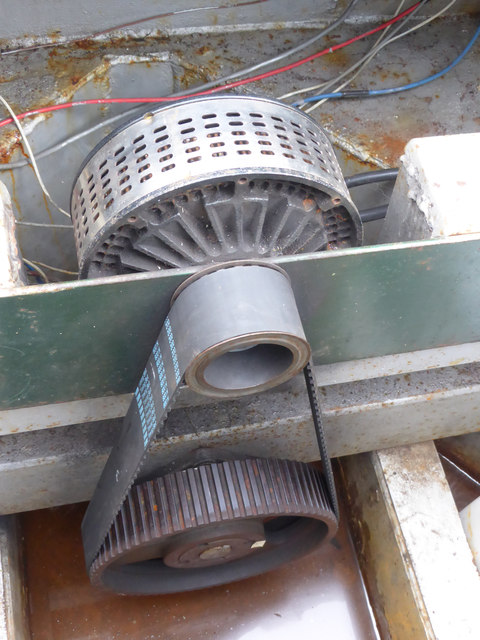
Motor and toothed belt drive to propeller shaft

Storage: 2.5 kilograms (5.5 lb) of hydrogen at 10-bar (1,000 kPa) in 5 Ti-V-Mn-Fe metal hydride solid-state hydrogen tanks, a lead acid battery stack, a 5-kW PEM fuel cell and a high torque NdFeB permanent magnet brushed DC electric motor.

== See also ==
- Hydride compressor
- Hydrogen ship
- Hydrogen storage#Metal hydrides
- Hydrogen vehicle
- Hydrogen economy
