= MF Hydra =

World's first liquid hydrogen-powered ferry

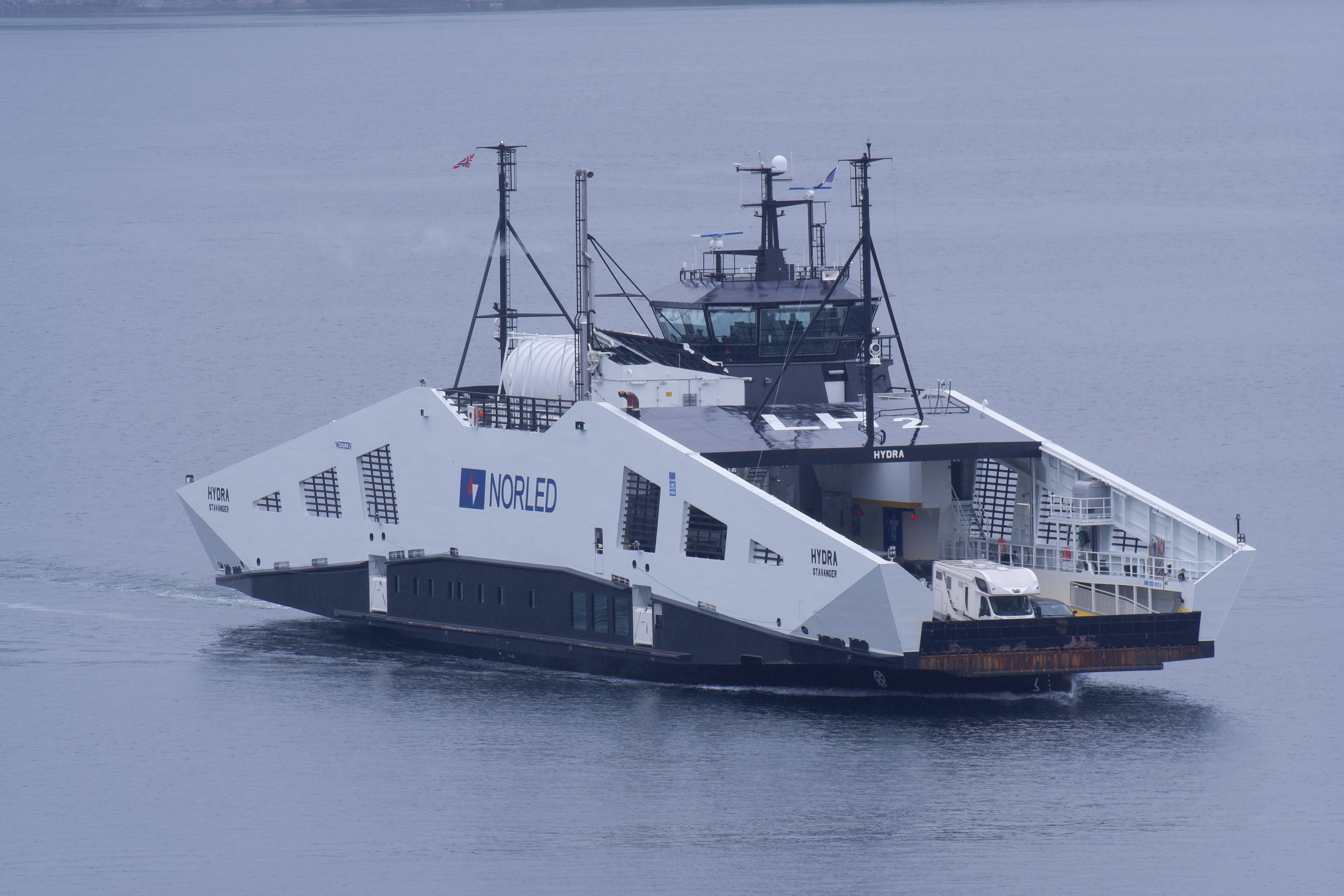

MF Hydra is the world's first liquid hydrogen-powered ferry. Delivered in 2021, the 82.4-meter-long vessel can accommodate up to 300 passengers and 80 vehicles. It has two 200 kW fuel cells, two 440 kW diesel generators, a 1.36 MWh battery, and two Shottel thrusters with a maximum speed of 9 knots. The vessel is operated by the Norwegian company Norled.

Equipped with an 80 cbm liquid hydrogen storage tank, the MF Hydra ferry was estimated to reduce direct annual carbon emissions by up to 95%. However, because the hydrogen is produced in Germany, the vessel's upstream emissions and cost are estimated to be more than double those of a diesel ferry.

== Design & Operations ==
Constructed by Westcon Yards with design from LMG Marin, MF Hydra measures 82.4 meters in length overall, with a beam of 17.5m, draft of 2.9m, and a depth of 4.1m. The vessel has a gross tonnage of 2,628 or 788 net. The vessel incorporates double-wall cryogenic storage for 80 cubic meters or 5.6 tons of liquid hydrogen at -253°C, enabling up to 12 days of operation or ~1,000 nautical miles. The hull is constructed from steel in a double-ended configuration to facilitate bidirectional loading and unloading for short-sea ferry routes.

The ferry serves a ~11 km round-trip route between Hjelmeland, Skipavik, and Nesvik in Norway, multiple times daily, since entering service in March 2023. It contributes to improved local air quality and reduced noise pollution, with hydrogen systems cutting NOx emissions by up to 90% and particulate matter by 99% relative to diesel.

== Criticism ==
The operational expenses are estimated to be 3x-4x greater than diesel ferries due to hydrogen production and supply chain inefficiencies. When upstream emissions of Germany's grid, hydrogen refinement / compression / liquefaction / leaks, diesel truck transport are factored in; it is estimated MF Hydra has double the emissions of a conventional diesel ferry. While green hydrogen could help address emission concerns, it remains more expensive; and may be a net greenhouse negative depending on hydrogen leakage with GWP100 of ~11.6x versus CO_{2}.
