= Yacht XV 1 =

Unfinished hydrogen-powered sailboat

The 42' sailboat known as the XV/1 was intended to demonstrate Haveblue LLC's patented technology for the production, storage, and use of hydrogen on board a marine vessel. The anticipated range was to be a radius of ~300 nautical miles at 8 knots (15 km/h; 9.2 mph) on a full tank.

== XV/1 System Configuration ==
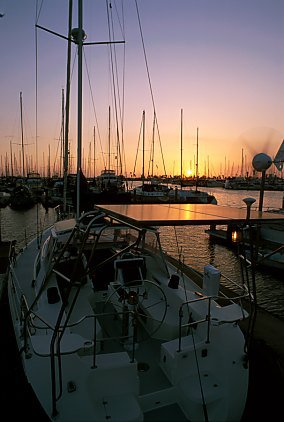
XV/1, showing wind turbine and solar panels

- Two solar panels producing ~600 watts at peak
- A marine wind generator producing ~90 watts at peak
- A regenerative electric drive motor capable of producing ~500 watts while under-sail
- A reverse-osmosis water-maker
- A hydrogen-generator using the electrolysis of water
- Hydrogen storage, either metal hydride or lightweight composite pressurized tanks
- 10-kilowatt PEM fuel cell
- Twelve 12v AGM batteries in a 144v, 105Ah bank
- Three house batteries, 12v parallel

== XV/1 Outcome ==
Management issues at Haveblue LLC prevented the completion of the XV/1 project.

== Technology overview ==
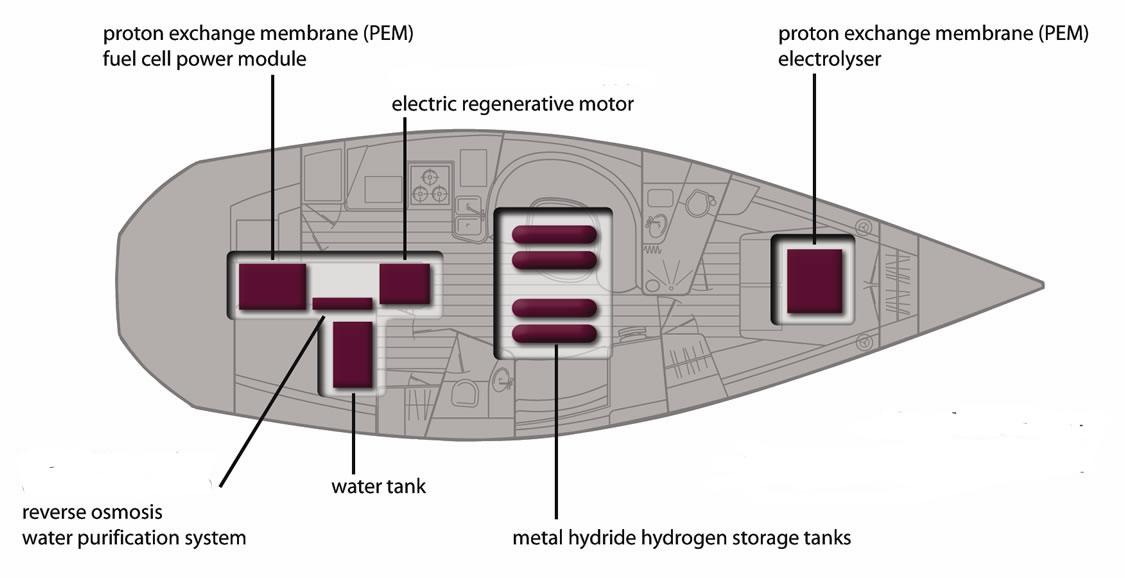
XV/1 schematic

The technology allows a marine vessel to be fully self-sustaining, without needing fossil fuels. It uses technologies known in the marine environment, such as solar panels, wind turbines, reverse osmosis water-makers, marine batteries, and electric motors in conjunction with fuel cells and the electrolysis of water. This reduces engine noise, vibration, exhaust fumes, and the risk of fuel spills that cause pollution of air and waters.

- A marine vessel obtains water from where it happens to be afloat (if necessary, it can also obtain water from a public utility).
- The "water-maker" processes the water to the required level of purity.
- The electrolysis unit produces hydrogen and oxygen from the purified water.
- The hydrogen is stored for use by a variety of power-plants, from fuel cell stacks to internal combustion engines.
- The hydrogen-consuming power-plant provides energy for propulsion and/or supplies the vessel's onboard energy needs (the hydrogen can also be utilized to reduce emissions produced by internal combustion engines).

Whether docked, moored, or underway, the renewable energy resources of a boat provide the electricity needed to continuously produce hydrogen via electrolysis for immediate use or stored for use later. If shore power is available, it may also be used for the hydrogen production and storage process.

== See also ==
- Hydrogen ship
- Hydrogen vehicle
- Hydrogen economy
