= No. 1 (yacht) =

History
- Name: No. 1
- Owner: IPF Energie- und Umwelttechnik GmbH
- Builder: Beneteau, in partnership with MTU Friedrichshafen
- Maiden voyage: August 2003, Japan
- Homeport: Kressbronn, Lake Constance

General characteristics
- Length: 12.26 m (40.2 ft)
- Beam: 3.76 m (12.3 ft)
- Installed power: 6 kg of hydrogen in 3 hydrogen tanks at 300 bar, four 1.2 kWa
- Speed: 7-knot (13 km/h) by fuel cell/electric
- Notes: First fuel cell-powered yacht

No. 1 is a sailing yacht which is power-assisted by an electric motor that gets its electricity from hydrogen fuel cells. It is the first ever yacht to be fuel cell-powered. The boat was certified under the Germanischer Lloyd guidelines for fuel cells on ships and boats. The yacht's debut was in August 2003 in Japan, and it is commissioned at Lake Constance (Kressbronn am Bodensee).

MTU Friedrichshafen, the company that designed the boat's power system, has said that it views a move towards fuel cell-based power systems as logical given the demand for clean, quiet energy sources in leisure craft such as yachts.

== Specifications ==
Boat 12.26 m long, width 3.76 m, 6 kg of hydrogen in 3 hydrogen tanks at 300 bar, four 1.2 kWa PEM fuel cells, 9 gel batteries, radius of action 225 km at a speed of 8 kts on the propeller.

== See also ==
- Hydrogen ship
- Hydrogen vehicle
- Hydrogen economy
