= Hydrogen Challenger =

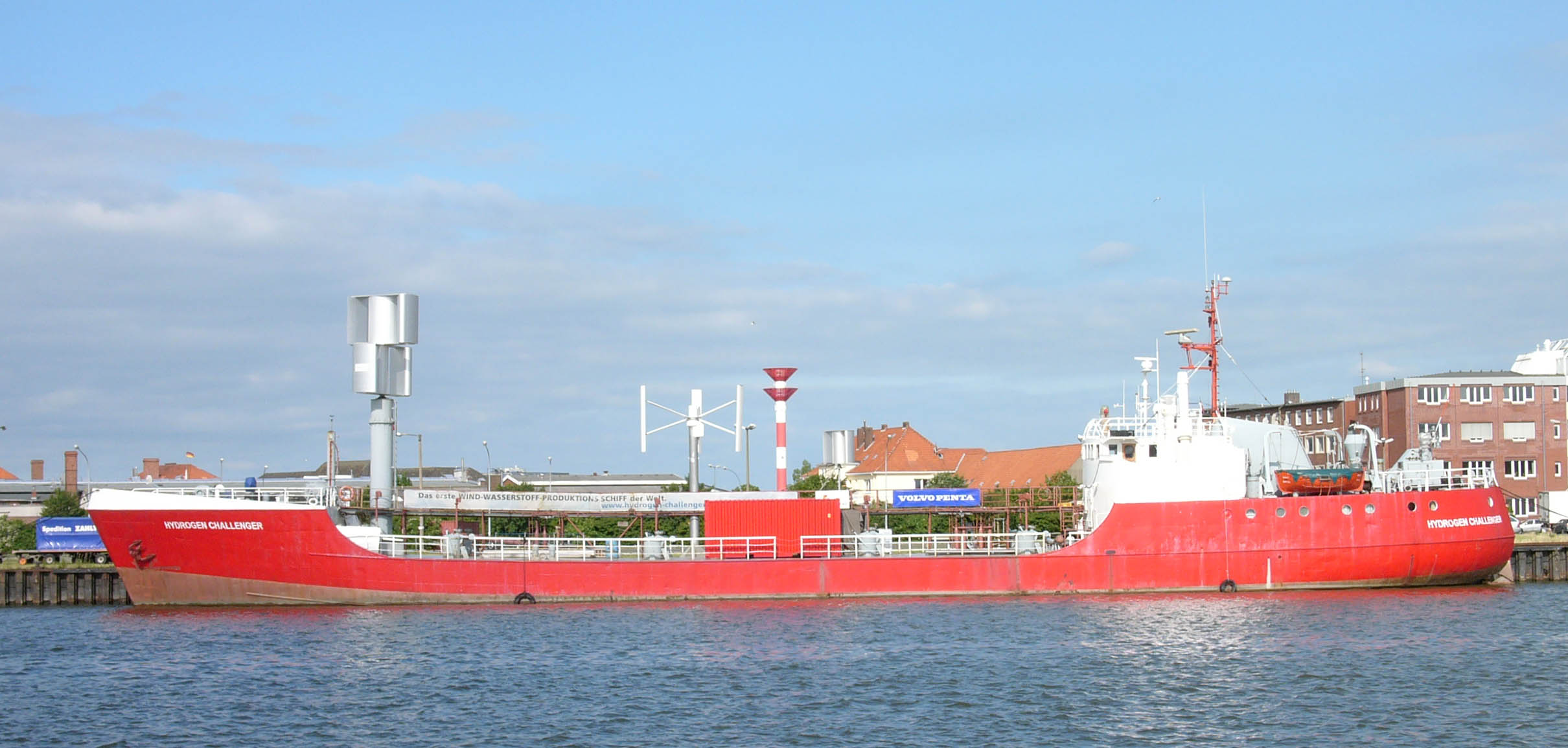
- Hydrogen Challenger

History

Germany
- Name: Hydrogen Challenger
- Launched: 17 February 1967
- Identification: IMO number: 6724153
- Fate: Scrapped 14 April 2013

General characteristics
- Tonnage: 424 GRT
- Length: 66 m (216 ft 6 in)

Hydrogen Challenger was a 66-metre (216 ft 6 in) refitted coastal tanker (previously Bernd) for mobile hydrogen production. It was fitted with a vertical axis wind turbine to generate electricity for the electrolysis of water to fill the hydrogen storage tanks. The total storage and transportation capacity was 1194 cubic metres (42200 cu ft). It was stationed in the German Bight near Heligoland (where the most wind is), and was to dock in Bremerhaven, where the hydrogen produced would be delivered to the market.

== History ==
The ship was lengthened from 56 to 66 metres (183 ft 9 in to 216 ft 6 in) in 1969. The added section can be seen in front of the bridge. The hydrogen conversion scheme was completed in 2004. However, the project appears to have been a subsidy fraud:

The ship never made trips in its planned function. The converter that was to produce the hydrogen was delivered by the manufacturer in good faith, but later taken back because the bill was not paid. Likewise, the much too small wind turbine ran basically empty, because the electricity was not used. Behind the project was a dubious company whose trail later fizzled out. The matter was covered up, and nobody talks about it today. The tanker almost sank in the harbour and was later scrapped.

== See also ==
- Hydrogen ship
- Hydrogen vehicle
