= Xperiance NX hydrogen =

Hydrogen ship

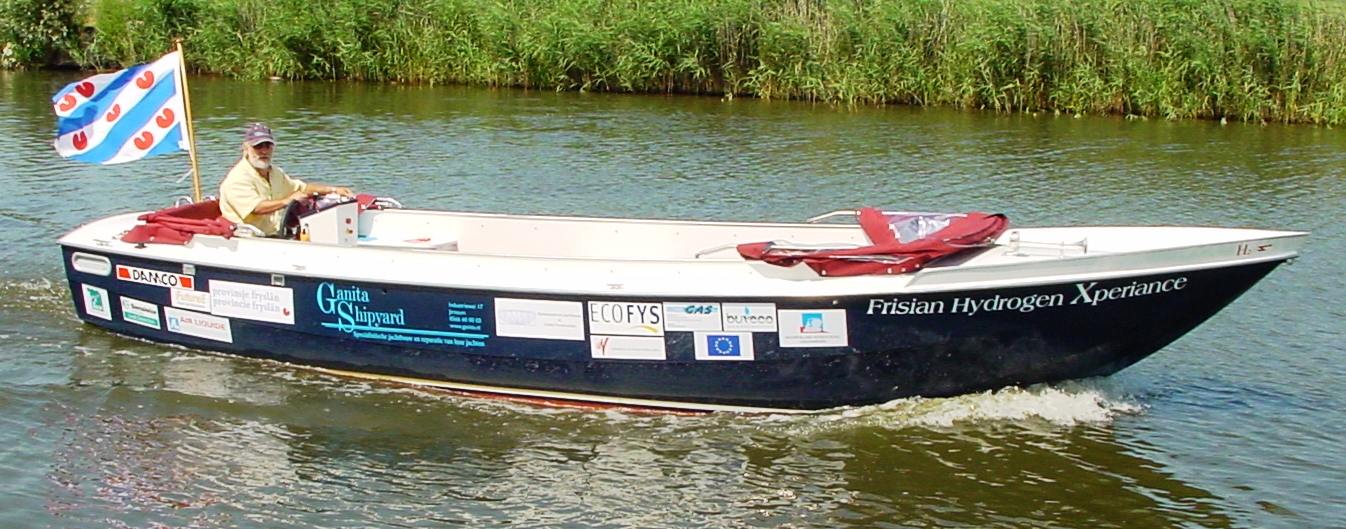
Xperiance NX hydrogen

The Xperiance NX hydrogen is a 12-person hydrogen ship, power-assisted by an electric motor that gets its electricity from a fuel cell. The debut was on 23 June 2006 at Leeuwarden, Netherlands.

== Refueling ==
The boats are refuelled with exchangeable tanks.

== Specifications ==
Boat 7 m long, width 2.35 m, draft 0.50 m, 4 exchangeable 200 bar (20 MPa), 30 liter hydrogen tanks, with a 1.2 kW PEM fuel cell and a 12 kW·h battery for 12 passengers. Its radius of action is 200 km.

== See also ==
- Hydrogen ship
- Hydrogen vehicle
