= DeepC =

Autonomous underwater vehicle powered by a fuel cell

The DeepC is a hydrogen-fueled Autonomous Underwater Vehicle (AUV), power-assisted by an electric motor that gets its electricity from a fuel cell. It debuted in 2004. The project was funded by the German Federal Ministry for Education and Research.

The DeepC is the first AUV to use hydrogen as a fuel.

== Specifications ==
DeepC weighs 2.4 tons, can operate in depths of up to 4,000 metres (13,100 ft), for a duration of up to 60 hours independently of a ship, at a speed of 4 to 6 knots. It can cover up to 400 kilometres (249 mi) with a payload of up to 300 kilograms (660 lb). It has two 60 cell PEMFC stacks.

== See also ==
- Hydrogen ship – Ship fueled by hydrogen
- Hydrogen vehicle – Vehicle that uses hydrogen fuel for motive power
- Hydrogen economy – Using hydrogen to decarbonize more sectors
- Timeline of hydrogen technologies
