= Zemships =

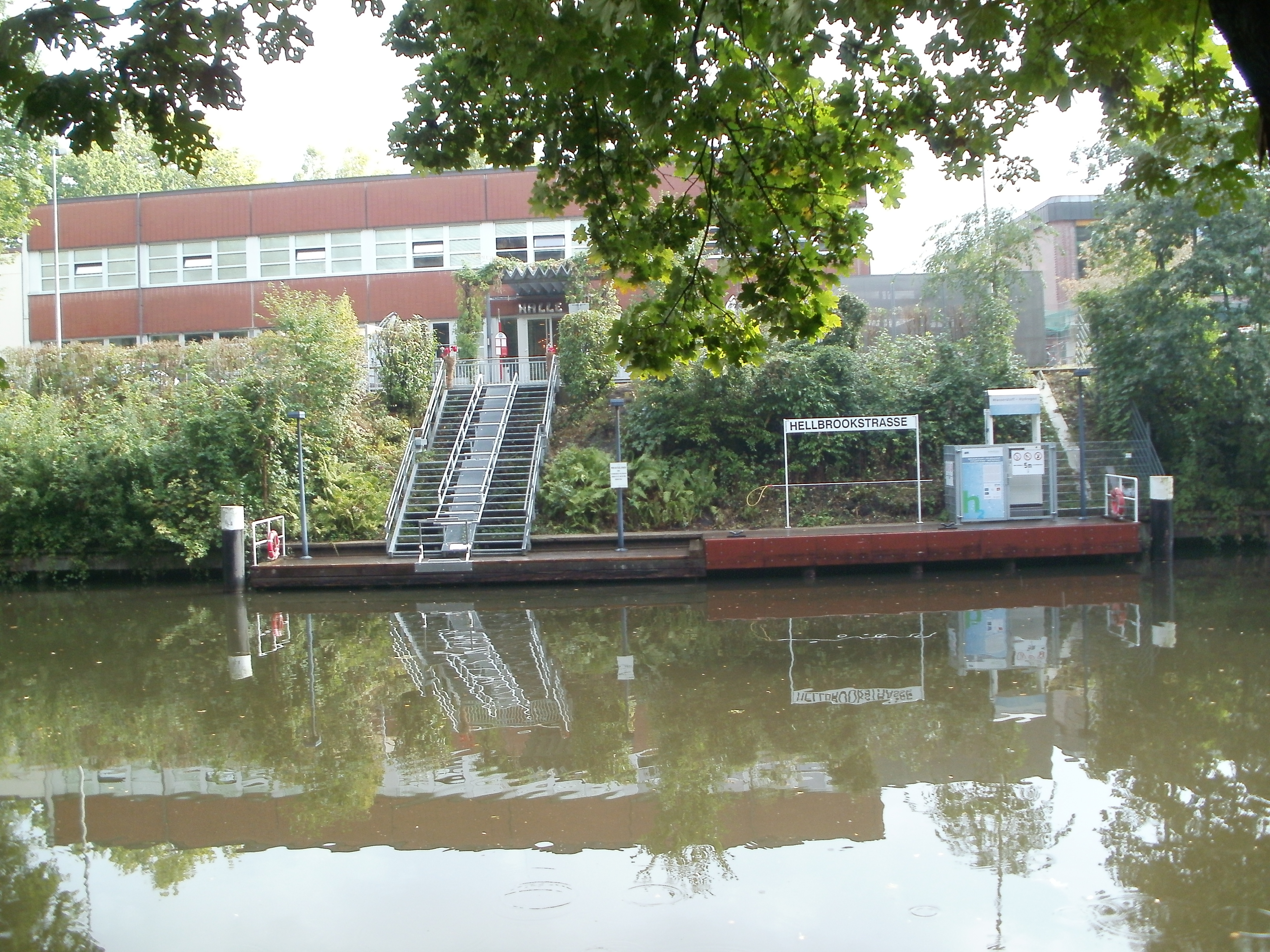
A hydrogen refilling station for the Alsterwasser in Hamburg.

The project Zemships (Zero Emissions Ships) developed the FCS Alsterwasser, a 100 person hydrogen-power passenger ship, power-assisted by an electric motor that gets its electricity from a fuel cell. The first boat operates on the Alster in Hamburg since 2008. The keel laying at the SSB shipyard in Oortkaten was on 4 December 2007.

== Refueling ==
The hydrogen station will be a storage tank with 17,000 liters of hydrogen for refueling. Compression is done with an ionic liquid piston compressor.

== Specifications ==
Boat for 100 passengers, 25.56 m long, 5.2 m wide, electric motor 100 kW, a hydrogen storage tank 350 bars, with two 48 kW PEM fuel cells (140 V DC) and an integrated battery (7 x 80 V, 360 Ah).

== See also ==
- Nemo H2
- Hydrogen ship
- Clean Urban Transport for Europe
- Zero Regio
- Germanischer Lloyd guidelines for fuel cells on ships and boats
