= Duffy-Herreshoff watertaxi =

18-person hydrogen fueled passenger ship

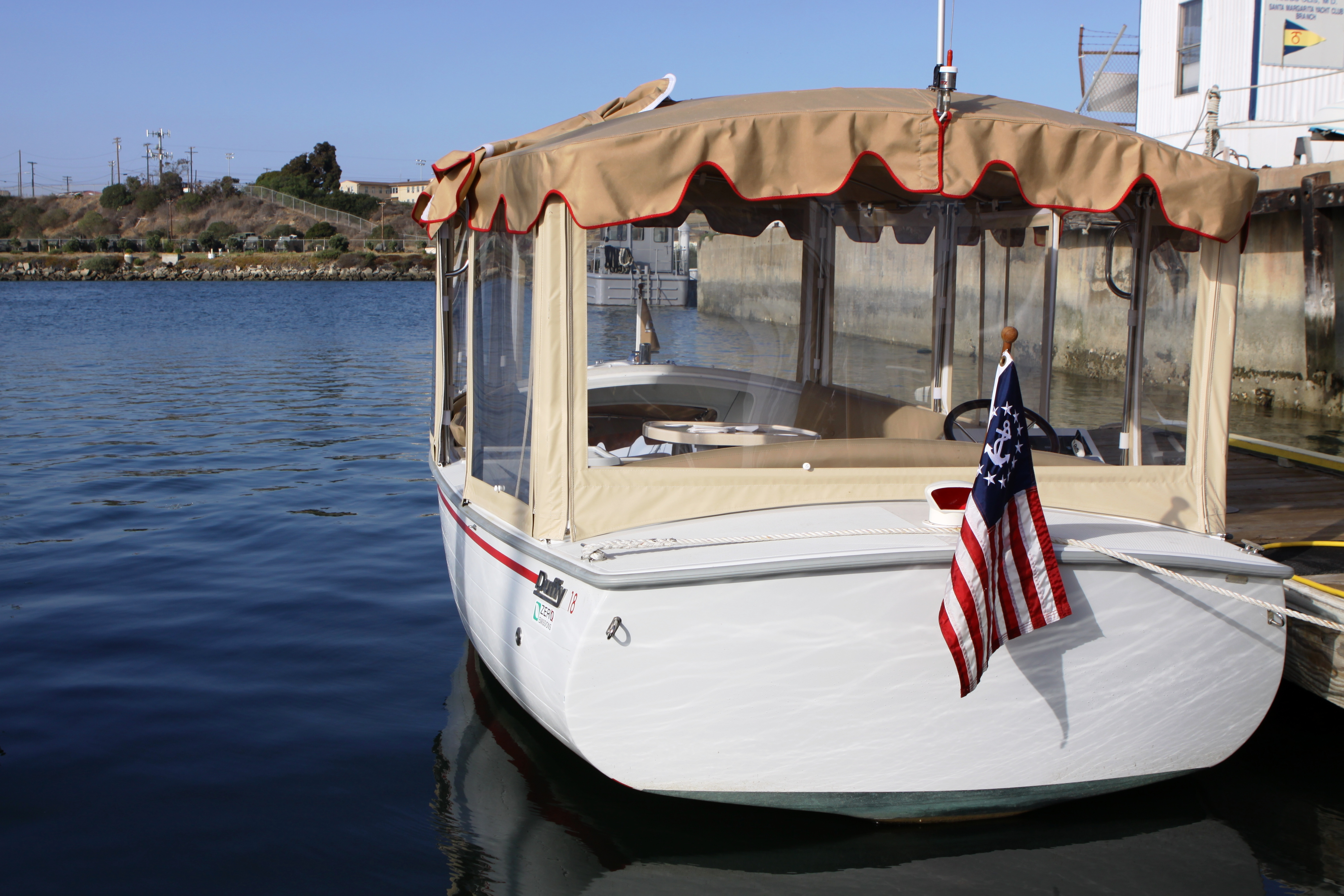
- The 18-foot long Duffy Model boat awaits passengers before gliding through the waters of the Pacific Ocean to watch the sunset during the Del Mar Marina’s Sunset Harbor Cruise, 2009.

History

United States
- Name: Duffy/Herreshoff 30
- Builder: Duffy Electric Boat Company
- Maiden voyage: 20 October 2003
- Home port: San Francisco
- Status: Unknown

General characteristics
- Type: Water taxi
- Length: 30 ft (9.1 m)
- Beam: 9 ft (2.7 m)
- Installed power: 4 × 1.5 kW (2 hp) proton exchange membrane fuel cells
- Propulsion: Electric motor
- Speed: 8 knots (15 km/h; 9.2 mph)
- Endurance: 10 hours
- Capacity: 18 passengers

The Duffy-Herreshoff DH30 watertaxi is an 18-person hydrogen fueled passenger ship, power-assisted by an electric motor that gets its electricity from a fuel cell. The watertaxi debuted on October 20, 2003 in San Francisco.

The project was funded by the Center for the Commercial Deployment of Transportation Technologies at California State University, Long Beach. It was the first hydrogen fuel cell boat used in the San Francisco Bay.

== Refueling ==
A 3 kW Hydrogen on demand system.

== Specifications ==
Boat 30 ft (9.144 m) long, with four 1.5 kW (2.0 hp) PEM fuel cells and an integrated battery, for 18 passengers.

== See also ==
- Hydrogen ship
- Hydrogen vehicle
- Hydrogen economy
