= Morgan LIFEcar =

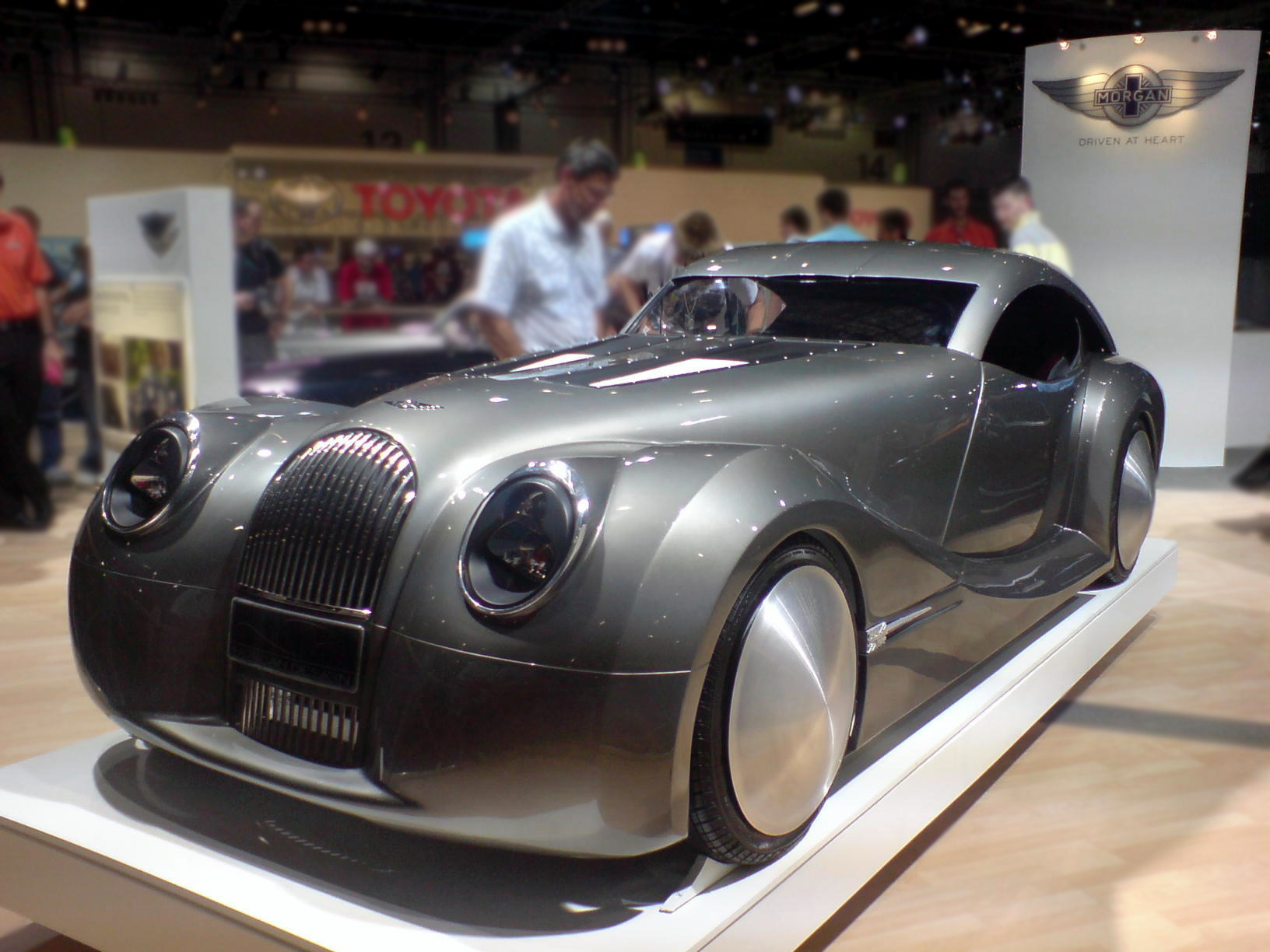

Overview
- Manufacturer: Morgan
- Production: 2009-

The Morgan LIFEcar (LIghtweight Fuel Efficient Car) was originally a fuel cell-powered electric vehicle project undertaken by Morgan Motor Company and startup company Riversimple. The goal of LIFEcar was a sports car that would be environmentally responsible, and deliver impressive performance. Research and development was backed by QinetiQ, a British defence technology firm, as well as several universities, including Cranfield University and the University of Oxford, and government grants. The project abandoned the fuel-cell architecture in favour of a hybrid approach with a 15-mile electric range.

== Specifications ==
According to news releases, the LIFEcar chassis is to be based on the powerful Morgan Aero 8, while the Proton exchange membrane fuel cell itself is being developed by QinetiQ. The vehicle is planned to make use of electric motors powering each wheel (similar to the Whispering Wheel concept). In order to deliver sufficient bursts of power to the motors, the electricity generated by the fuel cell will be stored in sophisticated capacitors. Morgan may make use of its past business ties with BMW in order to obtain liquid hydrogen storage technology, although this remains to be seen. The design of the vehicle platform was led by Mark Reeves, with aid from his team at Morgan.

== See also ==
- Fuel cell
- Hydrogen economy
- F-Cell
- Honda FCX
- Venturi Fetish
- Riversimple
