= Fine =

Fine may refer to:

== Characters ==
- Fran Fine, the title character of The Nanny
- Sylvia Fine (The Nanny), Fran's mother on The Nanny
- Officer Fine, a character in Tales from the Crypt, played by Vincent Spano

== Legal terms ==
- Fine (penalty), money to be paid as punishment for an offence
- Fine on alienation, a sum of money paid to a feudal lord when a tenant had occasion to make over his land to another
- Fine of lands, an obsolete type of land conveyance to a new owner
- Fine, a dated term for a premium on a lease of land

== Music ==
- Fine (band), a late 1990s American band
- Fine (album), a 1994 album by Snailhouse
- "Fine" (Taeyeon song), 2017
- "Fine" (Whitney Houston song), 2000
- "F.I.N.E.*", a 1989 song by Aerosmith
- Fine Glindvad Jensen, a Danish pop / jazz musician who releases albums simply under the name "Fine"
- "Fine", a song by James from the 2001 album Pleased to Meet You
- "Fine", a song by Kacey Musgraves from the 2015 album Pageant Material
- "Fine", a song by Kylie Minogue from the 2014 album Kiss Me Once
- "Fine", a song by Prism from the 1983 album Beat Street
- "fine", a 2019 song by Mike Shinoda
- "Fine", a song by the Linda Lindas from the 2022 album Growing Up
- "Fine", a 2006 song by Lemon Demon

== Brands and enterprises ==
- Fine (brandy), a term for some French brandy
- FINE (printing), a print head technology used in Canon printers
- Fine Air, an international cargo airline that operated from 1989 to 2002
- Toyota Fine (Fuel cell INnovation Emotion), a series of concept cars

== Metallurgy ==
- Fine, a term for the purity of precious metals; see Fineness
- Fine, to produce refined metal in a finery forge

== Other uses ==
- FINE, an informal association of the four main Fair Trade networks
- Fine (surname)
- Fine, New York, a town in the United States
- Fine sheaf, in mathematics
- Fine flounder, a species of flounder
- Fine, an attribute of certain cricket fielding positions
- Fine, Irish-language term for 'clan'; see Irish clans
- French frigate Fine, a 32-gun frigate launched in 1779
- Fine (brandy)

== See also ==
- Fine art(s)
- Fine topology (disambiguation), in mathematics
- Fines (disambiguation)
- Finest (disambiguation)
- Fein (disambiguation), including its variations and derivatives in surnames
- Fiennes (disambiguation)
- Fyne (disambiguation)
- Fynes, a given name and surname
