= Fines =

Fines may refer to:

- Fines, Andalusia, Spanish municipality
- Fine (penalty)
- Fine, a dated term for a premium on a lease of land, a large sum the tenant pays to commute (lessen) the rent throughout the term
- Fines, ore or other products with a small particle size
- Fines (coffee), dust-like sized particles in ground coffee

== People with the surname ==
- Clarence Fines, Canadian public servant
- Gordon Fines, Canadian politician

== See also ==
- Fine (disambiguation)
- Finings, a product of winemaking
- Ad Fines (disambiguation), Roman settlements
- Fiennes
- Fynes
