= Toyota Mirai =

Hydrogen fuel cell car

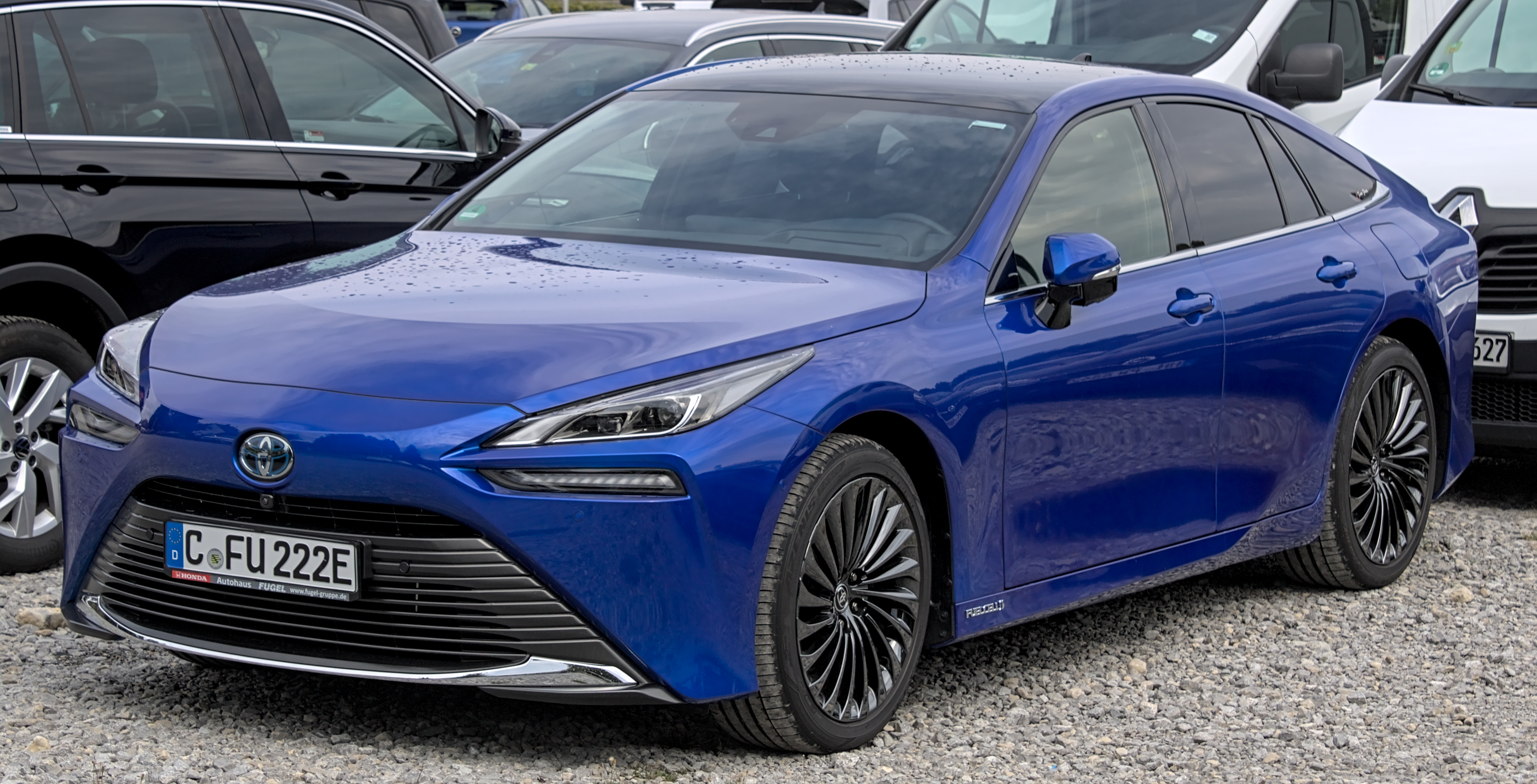

Overview
- Manufacturer: Toyota
- Production: December 2014 – present
- Assembly: Japan: Toyota City, Aichi (Motomachi plant)

Body and chassis
- Class: Mid-size luxury car/Executive car (E)
- Body style: 4-door sedan
- Layout: Front-motor, front-wheel-drive (JPD10); Rear-motor, rear-wheel-drive (JPD20)

The Toyota Mirai (Japanese: トヨタ・MIRAI, Hepburn: Toyota Mirai) (from mirai (未来), Japanese for 'future') is a mid-size hydrogen fuel cell vehicle (FCV) manufactured by Toyota, and is the first FCV to be mass-produced and sold commercially. The Mirai was unveiled at the November 2014 Los Angeles Auto Show. As of November 2022, global sales totaled 21,475 units; the top-selling markets were the U.S. with 11,368 units, Japan with 7,435 and the rest of the world with 2,622.

Under the U.S. Environmental Protection Agency (EPA) cycle, the 2016 model year Mirai has a total range of 502 km (312 mi) on a full tank. The MPG-equivalent combined city/highway fuel economy rating was 66 mpg_{‑US} (3.6 L/100 km; 79 mpg_{‑imp}), making the Mirai the most fuel-efficient hydrogen fuel cell vehicle rated at the time by the EPA, and the one with the longest range. In August 2021, the second-generation Mirai set a world record of traveling 1,360 km (845 mi) with a full tank of 5.65 kg (12.5 lb) of hydrogen.

Sales in Japan began on 15 December 2014 at ¥6.7 million (~US$57,400) at Toyota Store and Toyopet Store locations. The Japanese government plans to support the commercialization of fuel-cell vehicles with a subsidy of ¥2 million (~US$19,600). Retail sales in the U.S. began in August 2015 at a price of US$57,500 before any government incentives. Deliveries to retail customers began in California in October 2015. As of June 2016, the Mirai was available for retail sales in the UK, Denmark, Germany, Belgium, and Norway. Pricing in Germany started at €60,000 (~US$75,140) plus VAT (€78,540).

== History ==
=== FCV concept ===
The Mirai is based on the Toyota FCV-R (Fuel Cell Vehicle) concept car, which was unveiled at the 2011 Tokyo Motor Show and the Toyota FCV (Fuel Cell Vehicle) concept car, which was unveiled at the 2013 Tokyo Motor Show. The unveiled FCV concept was a bright blue sedan shaped like a drop of water "to emphasize that water is the only substance that hydrogen-powered cars emit from their tailpipes." The FCV has a large grille and other openings to allow cooling air and oxygen intake for use by the fuel cell. According to Toyota, the FCV concept is close in appearance to the expected production version of the car. The FCV size is similar to the Camry. The FCV range is expected to be approximately 700 km (430 mi) under Japan's JC08 test cycle.

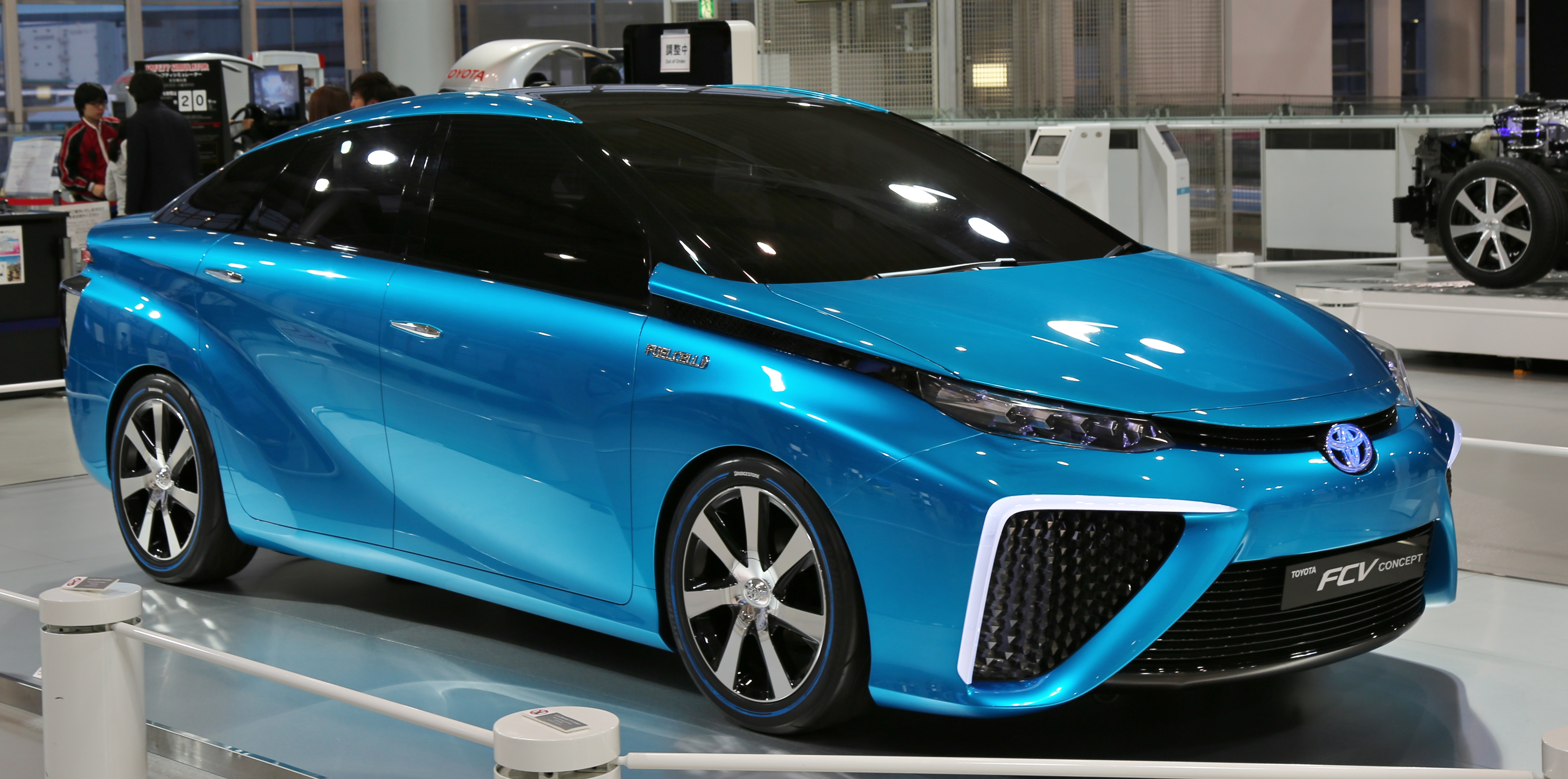
Toyota FCV concept car

According to Toyota, the FCV features a fuel cell system with an output power density of 3.0 kW/L, which is twice as high as that of its previous fuel cell concept, the Toyota FCHV-adv, delivering an output power of more than 100 kW, despite significant unit downsizing. The FCV uses Toyota's proprietary, small, light-weight fuel cell stack and two 70 MPa high-pressure hydrogen tanks placed beneath the specially designed body. The Toyota FCV concept can accommodate up to four occupants. For the full-scale market launch in 2015, the cost of the fuel cell system is expected to be 95% lower than that of the 2008 Toyota FCHV-adv.

The FCV concept also uses portions of Toyota's Hybrid Synergy Drive technology including the electric motor, power control unit and other parts and components from its hybrid vehicles to improve reliability and minimize cost. The hybrid technology is also used to work together with the fuel cell. At low speeds such as city driving, the FCV runs just like any all-electric car by using the energy stored in its battery, which is charged through regenerative braking. At higher speeds, the hydrogen fuel cell alone powers the electric motor. When more power is needed, for example during sudden acceleration, the battery supports the fuel cell system as both work together to provide propulsion.

In June 2014, Toyota showcased an FCV with an exterior design close to production, announced details about pricing in Japan, and set a domestic market launch before April 2015, with initial sales limited to regions where hydrogen refueling infrastructure is being developed.

=== Timeline ===
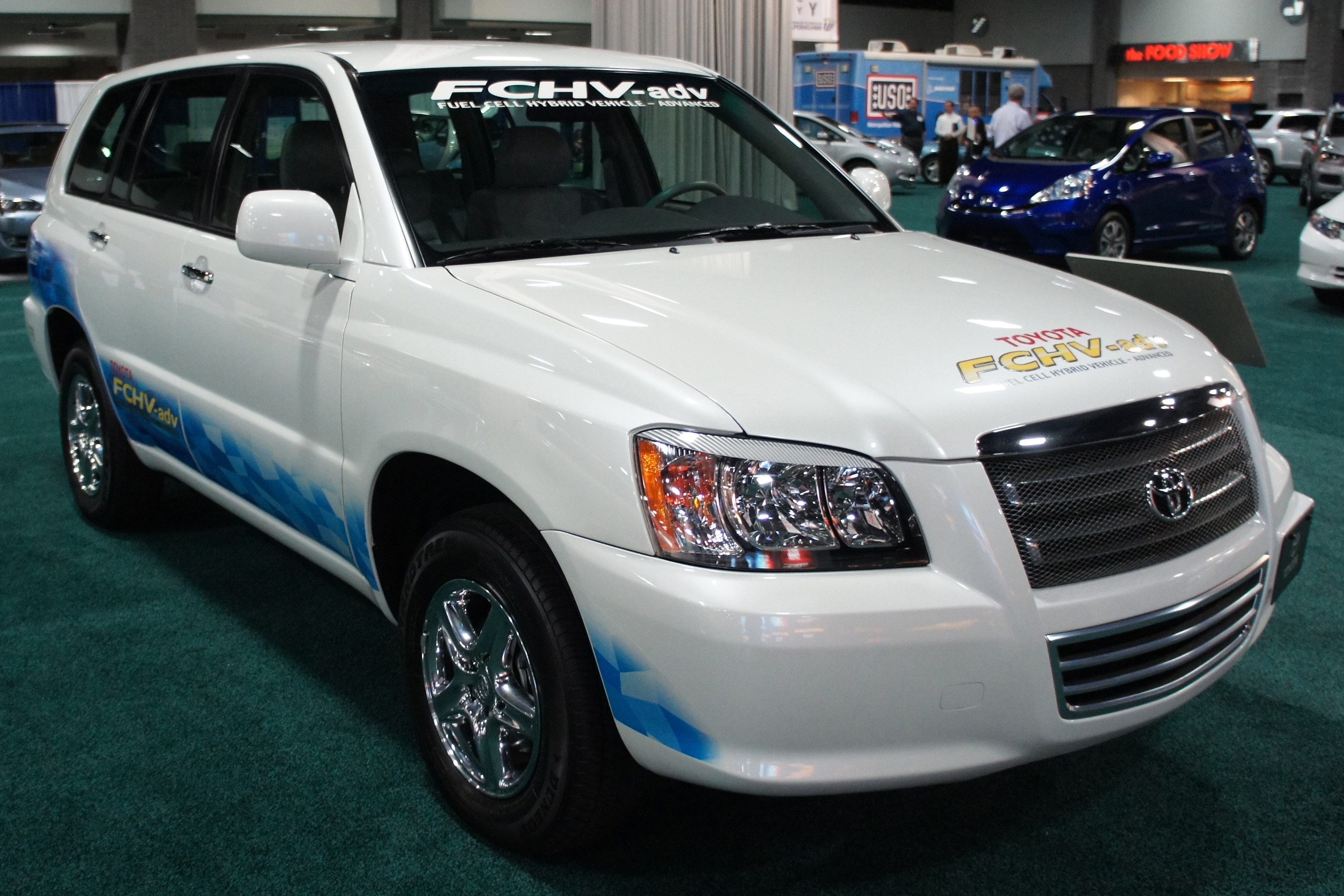
Toyota FCHV-adv SUV

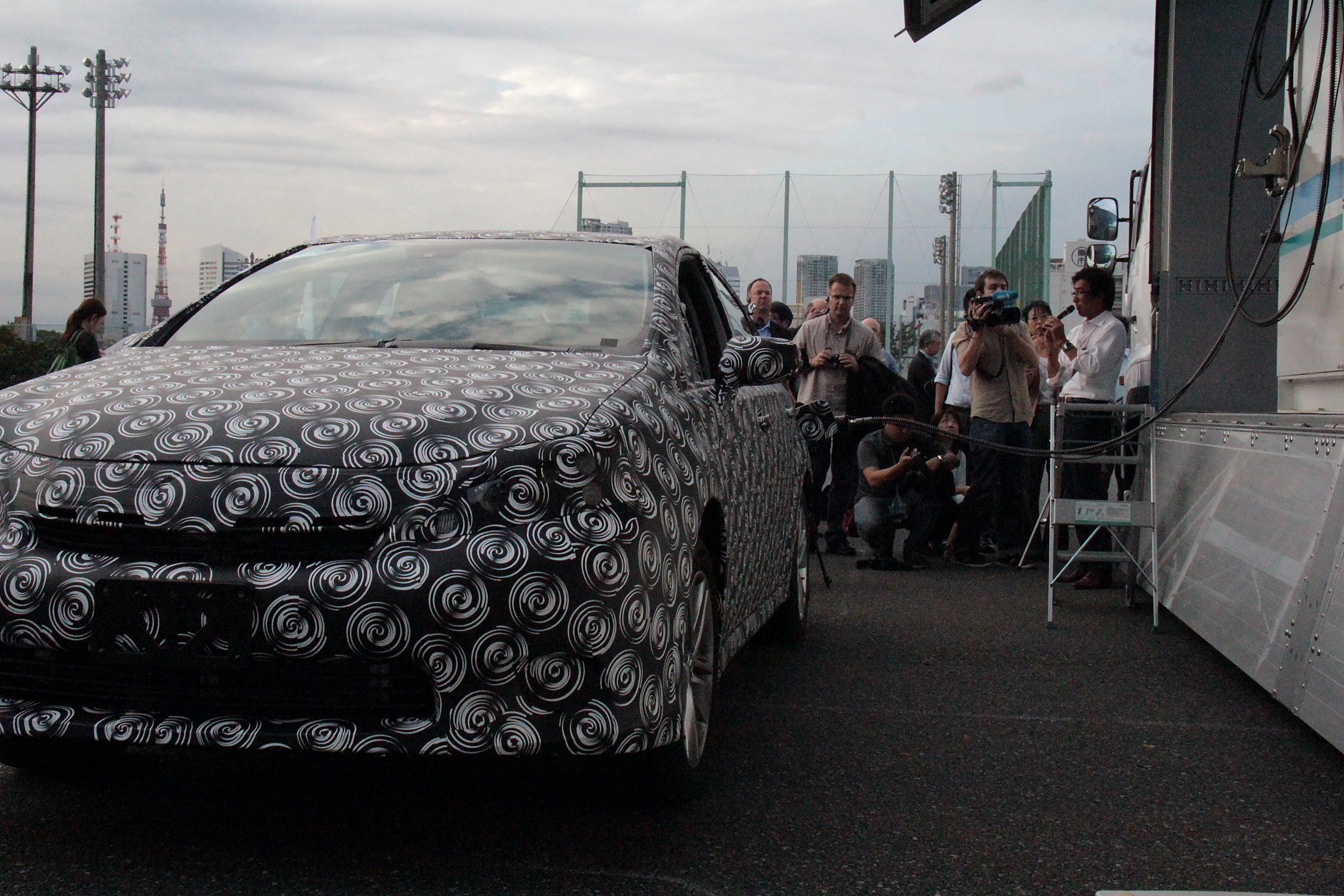
Toyota fuel cell test mule fueling hydrogen in Tokyo.

- 1992: Toyota starts development of FCV technology.
- 1996: The EVS13, an FCV with a metal hydride hydrogen tank, takes part in a parade in Osaka.
- 2001: Toyota shows the FCHV-4, FCHV-5, and Daihatsu MOVE FCV-K-II fuel-cell cars at the Tokyo Motor Show.
- 2002: The Highlander-based FCHV is available for limited sales in the U.S. and Japan. The fuel-cell stack outputs 90 kW. The cruising range is 300 km (185 miles). Two FCHVs are delivered to the Irvine and Davis campuses of University of California, four go to government departments in Japan.
- 2003: Toyota and Daihatsu begin road testing of the MOVE FCV-K-II, a fuel-cell Kei car.
- 2005: FCHV receives type certification in Japan.
- 2008: The FCHV-adv has increased range of 830 km (515 miles) for the 10-15 test cycle and better cold start capabilities.
- 2009: U.S. government drops funding for hydrogen fuel-cell cars.
- 2010: A Toyota/Hino FCHV Bus services daily commercial routes between Tokyo's Haneda Airport and the city center.
- 2011: Satoshi Ogiso, deputy chief officer Product Planning Group, declares all technical problems as solved, says “the only remaining real issue that stands in the way of fuel-cell electric vehicles is mass production cost.”
- 2011: Toyota shows an FCV concept vehicle, dubbed "FCV-R," at the Tokyo Motor Show.
- 2012: Toyota Chairman Takeshi Uchiyamada says: “The current capabilities of electric vehicles do not meet society’s needs, whether it may be the distance the cars can run, or the costs, or how it takes a long time to charge.”
- 2013: Reporters drive test mules of the fuel cell vehicle. Toyota demonstrates that fueling takes less than three minutes.
- 2013: Toyota shows FCV sedan at Tokyo Motor Show.
- June 2014: Toyota shows close-to-production FCV to the press. Announces early 2015 availability in Japan at around ¥7,000,000.
- November 2014: Toyota launches a press release and photos detailing the production version of the fuel cell vehicle. Also announced is the official model name of Mirai which means "future".
- April 2015: The Mirai was the first hydrogen fuel cell vehicle to pace a NASCAR race at the Toyota Owners 400 at Richmond, US.
- June 2015: The Mirai was the pace car at the Toyota/Save Mart 350 at Sonoma, US.
- 21 October 2015: Start sale and deliver in California, the same day to which the fusion-powered flying car in the film Back to the Future Part II time-travelled.
- August 2018: A Mirai was refilled in Australia with hydrogen separated from ammonia using a membrane technology.
- October 2019: The second-generation Mirai for 2021 model year is announced, based on the rear-wheel drive TNGA platform. It is significantly longer, wider and lower than the first-generation model.
- July 2024: Toyota was sued in California class action over the lack of availability of hydrogen available for fuel cell electric cars.

=== Testing ===
Toyota began fuel cell development in Japan in the early 1990s and has developed a series of fuel cell vehicles, subjecting them to more than 1,600,000 km (1,000,000 miles) of road testing.

Since 2012, fuel cell test vehicles have logged thousands of miles on North American roads. This includes hot testing in Death Valley, cold testing in Yellowknife, Canada, steep grade hill climbs in San Francisco and high altitude trips in Colorado. The Toyota-designed carbon fiber hydrogen tanks have also undergone extreme testing to ensure their strength and durability in a crash.

Between September 2015 and February 2016, one Mirai was driven 100,000 km (62,000 miles) in 107 days on different roads in Hamburg, using just over one tonne of hydrogen.

Toyota started testing two Mirai fuel cells in an electric Class 8 semi-trailer truck in the Port of Los Angeles in 2017 as part of Project Portal.

== First generation (JPD10; 2014) ==
First generation
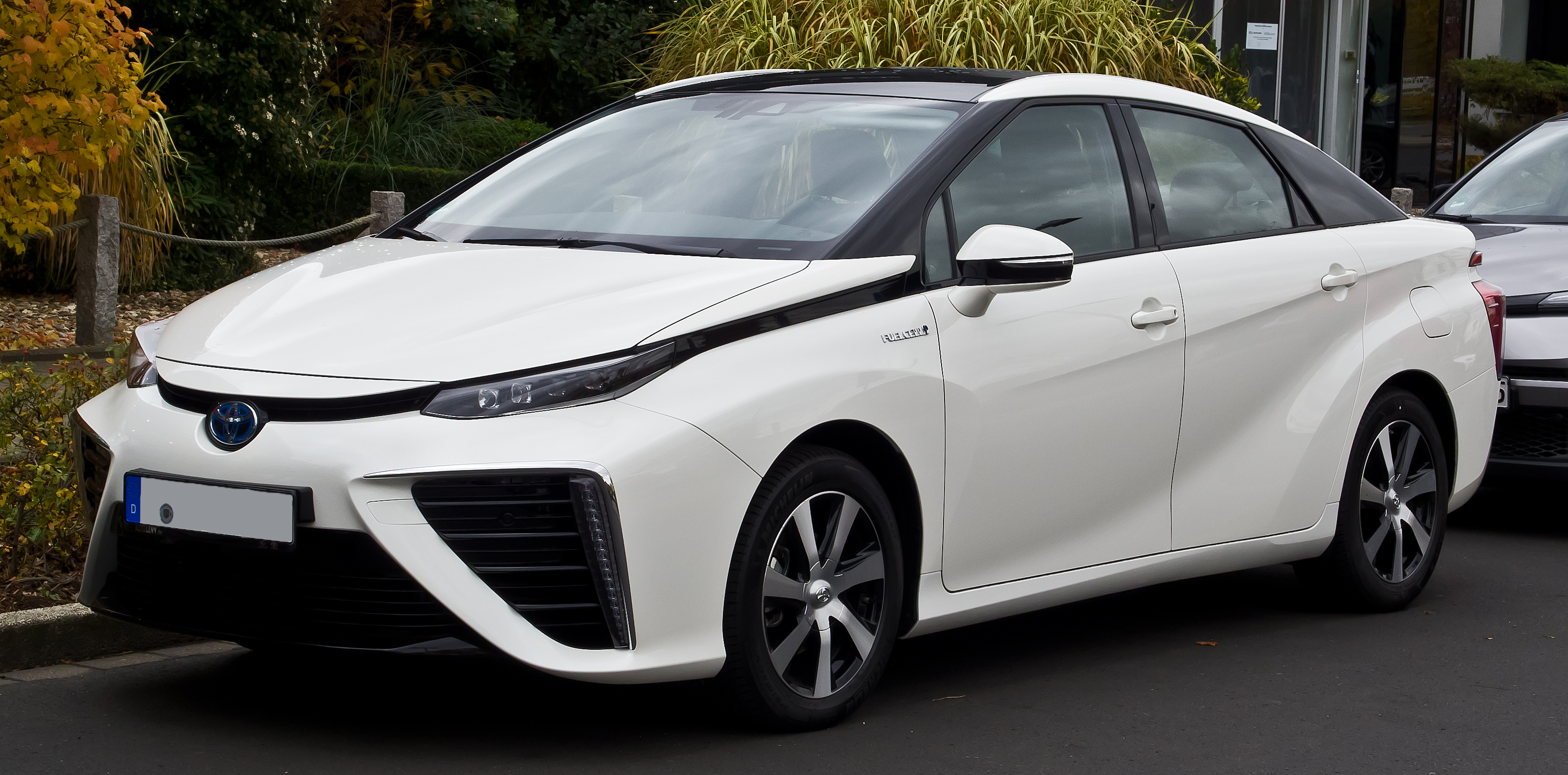

Overview
- Model code: JPD10
- Production: December 2014 – 2020
- Model years: 2015–2020

Body and chassis
- Layout: Front-motor, front-wheel-drive

Powertrain
- Electric motor: 4JM Fuel cell-powered 113 kW (152 hp) 335 N⋅m (247 lbf⋅ft)
- Transmission: 1-speed
- Battery: 1.6 kWh Nickel-metal hydride
- Range: 502 km (312 mi) (EPA) 122 liters (2 x hydrogen tanks)

Dimensions
- Wheelbase: 2,780 mm (109.4 in)
- Length: 4,890 mm (192.5 in)
- Width: 1,815 mm (71.5 in)
- Height: 1,535 mm (60.4 in)
- Curb weight: 1,850 kg (4,078.6 lb)

=== Specifications ===
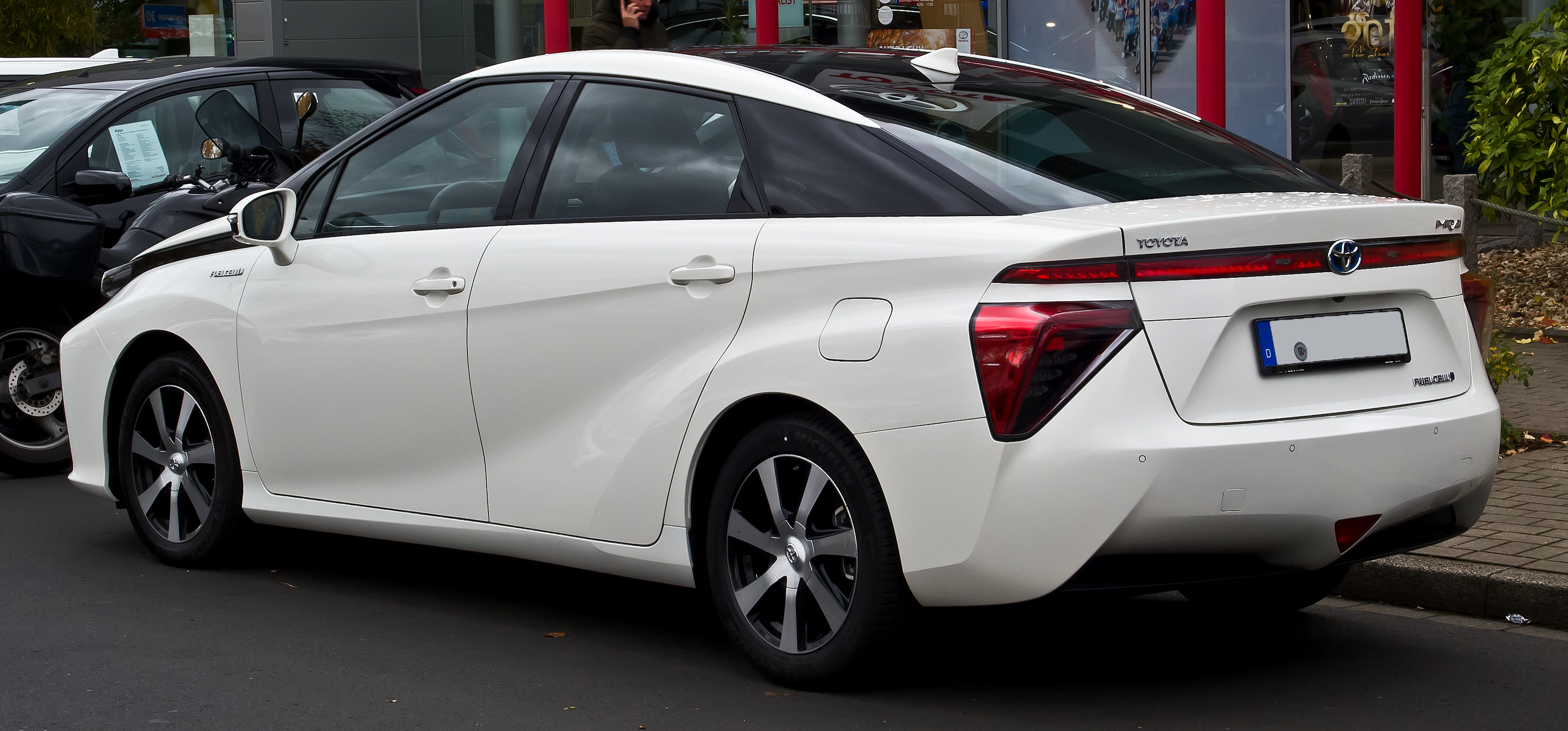
Rear view

The Mirai uses the Toyota Fuel Cell System (TFCS), which features both fuel cell technology and hybrid technology, and includes proprietary Toyota-developed components including the fuel cell (FC) stack, FC boost converter, and high-pressure hydrogen tanks. The TFCS is more energy-efficient than internal combustion engines and emits no CO_{2} at the point of operation or substances of concern (SOCs) when driven. The system accelerates Mirai from 0 to 97 km/h (0 to 60 mph) in 9.0 seconds and delivers a passing time of 3 seconds from 40 to 64 km/h (25 to 40 mph). The Mirai refueling takes between 3 and 5 minutes, and Toyota expected a total range of 480 km (300 miles) on a full tank. The Mirai has a button labeled H_{2}O that opens a gate at the rear, dumping the water vapor that forms from the hydrogen-oxygen reaction in the fuel cell. The exhaust H_{2}O or water volume is 240 mL per 4 km running.

Excess water is pumped out of the car

At the end of the journey, there is still some water left in the pipes. Using the H_{2}O button the water from the vehicle is pumped through the pipes out of the car. The video shows the process after about 30 km (20 miles) drive.

==== Fuel economy and range ====
Under the United States Environmental Protection Agency (EPA) cycle, the 2016 model year Mirai has a range of 502 km (312 mi) on a full tank, with a combined city/highway fuel economy rating of 66 mpg_{‑US} (3.6 L/100 km; 79 mpg_{‑imp}) equivalent (MPG-equivalent).

The official Toyota consumption declaration states hydrogen is consumed at the rate of 0.8 kg/100 km (2.8 lb/100 miles) on the combined urban/extra urban cycle.

==== Fuel cell stack ====
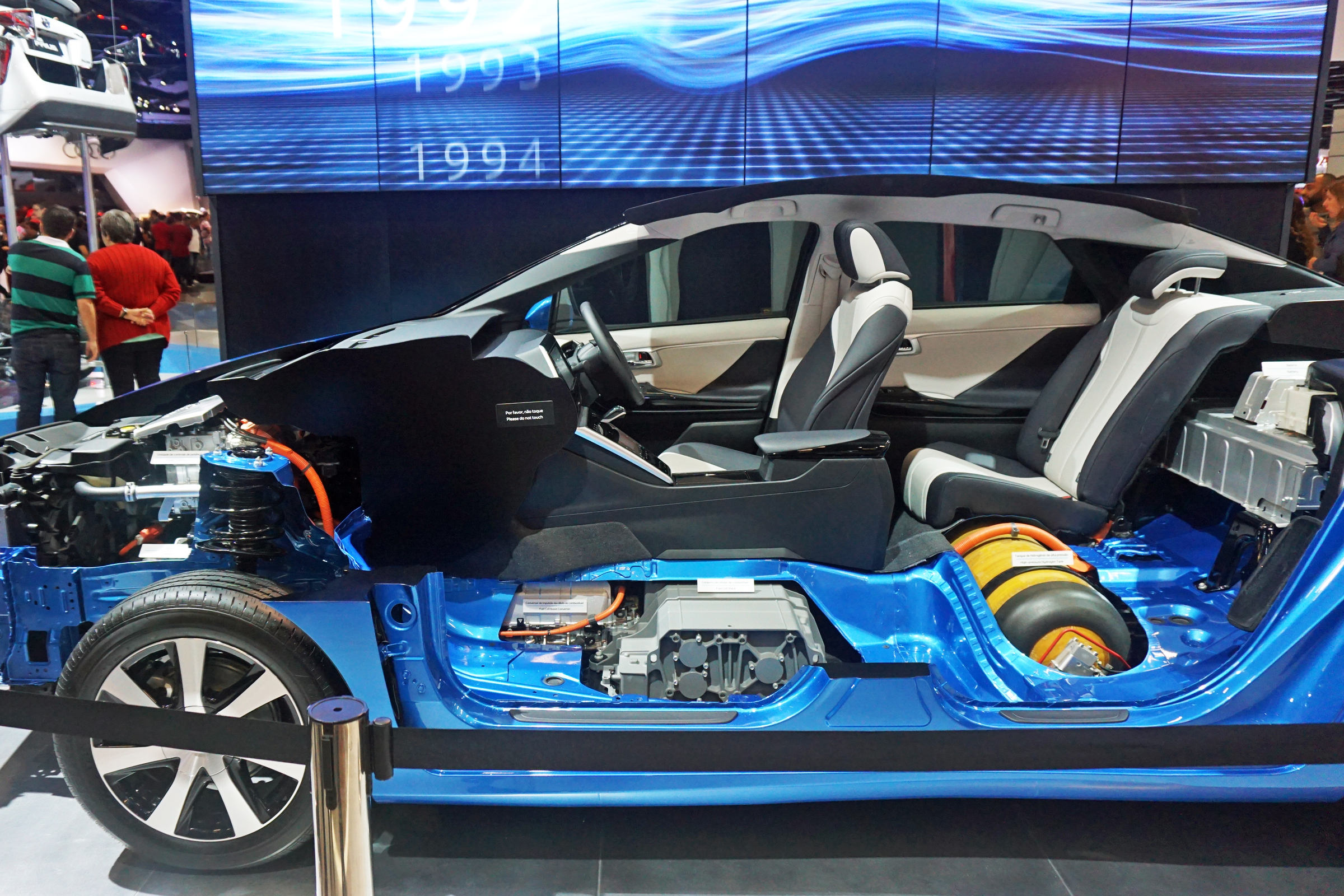
Mirai cutaway showing the power control unit and the electric traction motor in the front, the fuel cell stack and hydrogen storage tank in the middle, and the nickel–metal hydride rechargeable battery above in the rear.

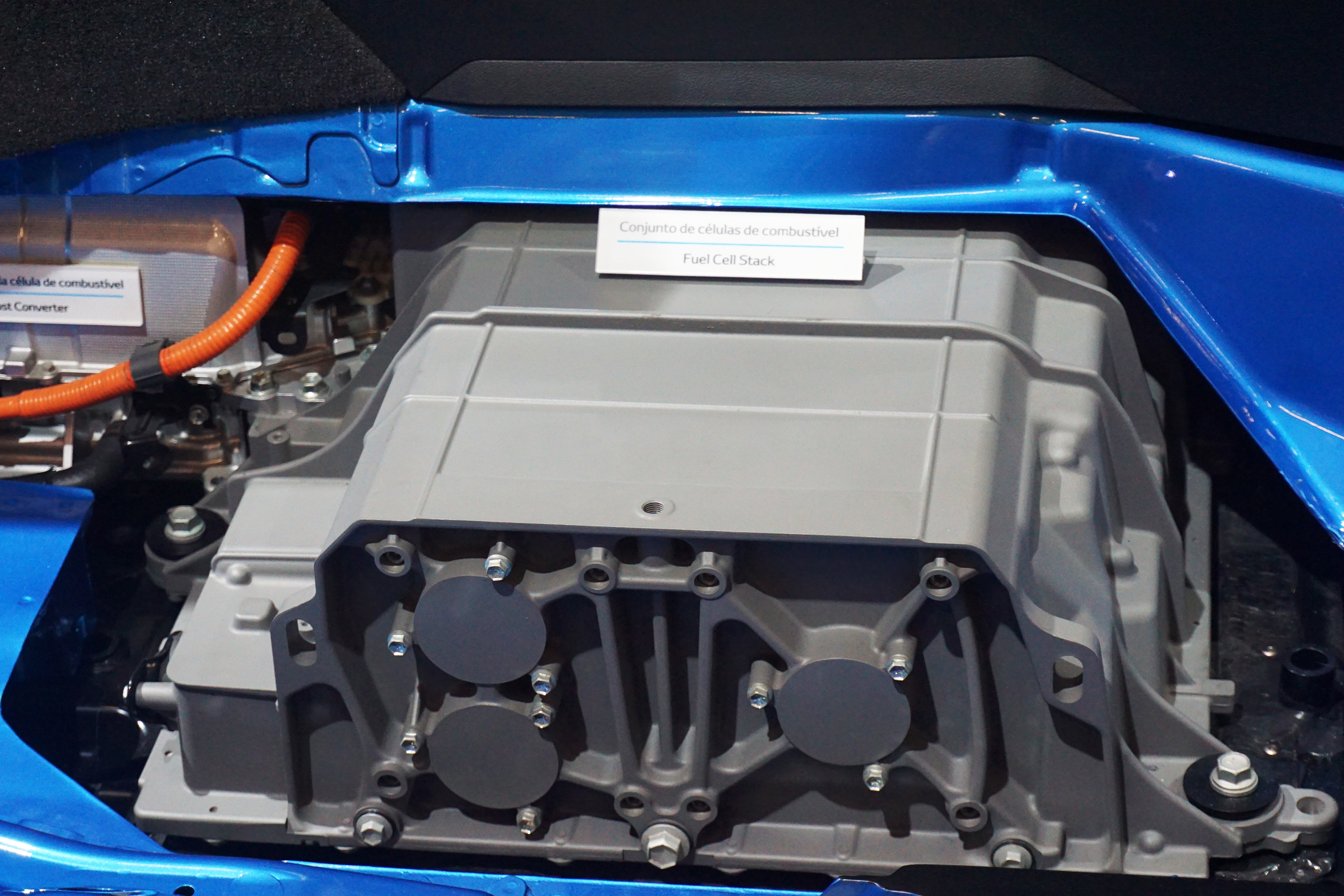
The Mirai's fuel cell stack

The first generation of Toyota FC Stack achieved a maximum output of 114 kW (153 hp; 155 PS). Electricity generation efficiency was enhanced through the use of 3D fine mesh flow channels. These channels—a world first, according to Toyota—were arranged in a fine three-dimensional lattice structure to enhance the dispersion of air (oxygen), thereby enabling uniform generation of electricity on cell surfaces. This, in turn, provided a compact size and a high level of performance, including the stack's world-leading power output density of 3.1 kW/L (2.2 times higher than that of the previous Toyota FCHV-adv limited-lease model), or 2.0 kW/kg. Each stack comprises 370 (single-line stacking) cells, with a cell thickness of 1.34mm (0.05 in) and weight of 102 grams (3.6 oz). The compact Mirai FC stack generates about 160 times more power than the residential fuel cells on sale in Japan. The Mirai has a new compact (13-litre (2.9 imp gal; 3.4 US gal)), high-efficiency, high-capacity converter developed to boost voltage generated in the Toyota FC Stack to 650 volts.

==== High-pressure hydrogen tanks ====
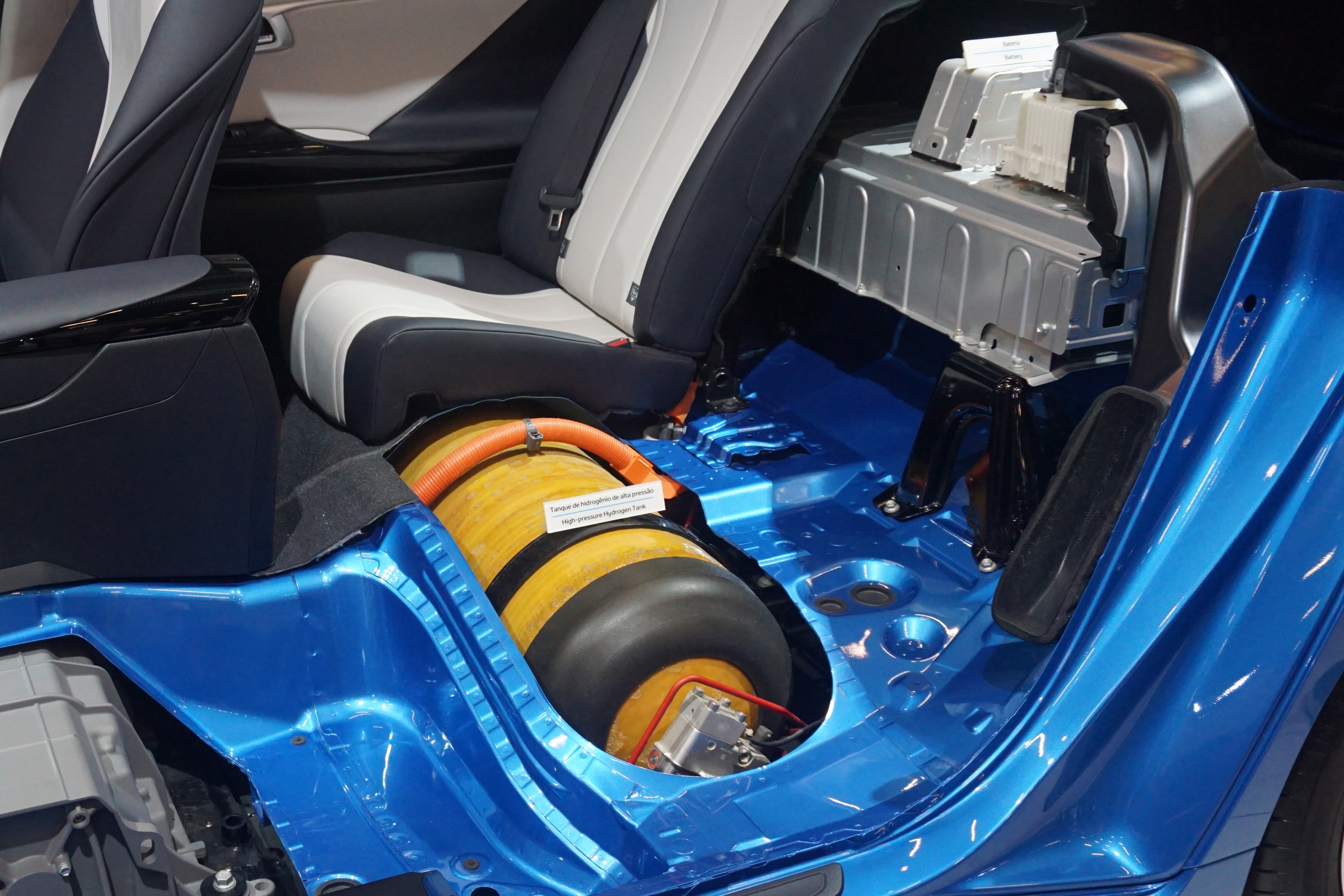
The Mirai's high-pressure hydrogen tank and rechargeable battery pack on top

The Mirai has two hydrogen tanks with a three-layer structure made of carbon fiber-reinforced plastic consisting of nylon 6 from Ube Industries and other materials. The tanks are 122 litres (27 imp gal; 32 US gal) combined, and store hydrogen at 70 MPa (10,000 psi). The tanks have a combined weight of 87.5 kg (193 lb), and 5 kg (11 lb) capacity.

==== Electric traction motor and battery ====
Toyota's latest generation hybrid components were used extensively in the fuel cell powertrain, including the electric motor, power control and main battery. The electric traction motor delivers 113 kilowatts (152 hp; 154 PS) and 335 N⋅m (247 lbf⋅ft) of torque. The Mirai has a 245V (1.6 kWh) sealed nickel-metal hydride (NiMH) traction rechargeable battery pack, similar to the one used in the Camry hybrid.

==== Safety ====
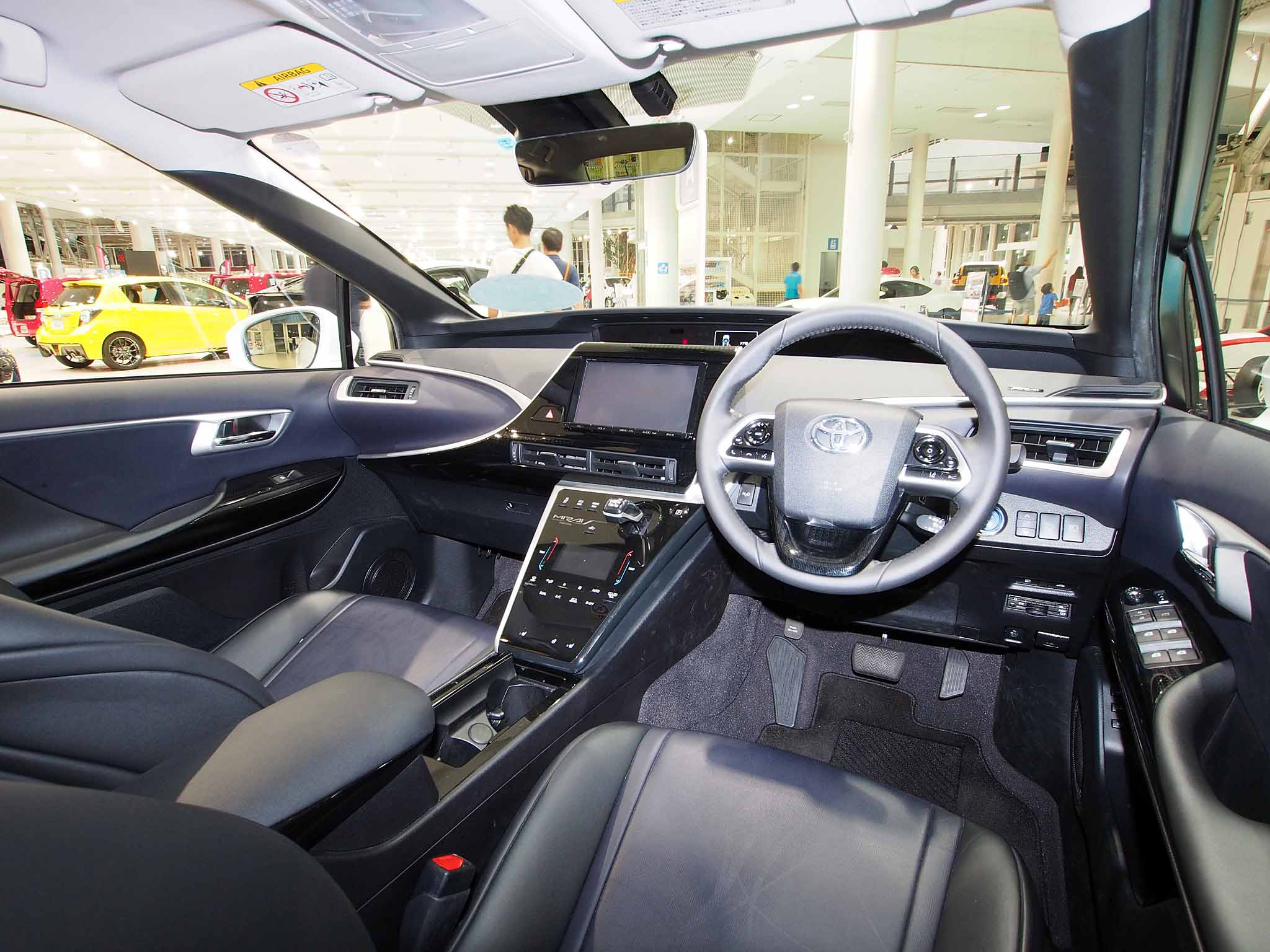
Interior

At Toyota's Higashi-Fuji Technical Center, the Mirai has been subjected to extensive crash testing to evaluate a design specifically intended to address frontal, side and rear impacts and to provide claimed excellent protection of vehicle occupants. A high level of collision safety has also been achieved to help protect the fuel cell stack and high-pressure tanks against body deformation. The high pressure hydrogen tanks are claimed to have excellent hydrogen permeation prevention performance, strength, and durability. Hydrogen sensors provide warnings and can shut off tank main stop valves. The hydrogen tanks and other hydrogen-related parts are located outside the cabin to ensure that if hydrogen leaks, it will dissipate easily. The vehicle structure is enhanced with carbon-fiber-reinforced polymers from Toray and designed to disperse and absorb impact energy across multiple parts to ensure a high-impact safety performance that protects the Toyota FC Stack and high-pressure hydrogen tanks during frontal, side or rear impacts.

== Second generation (JPD20; 2020) ==
Second generation
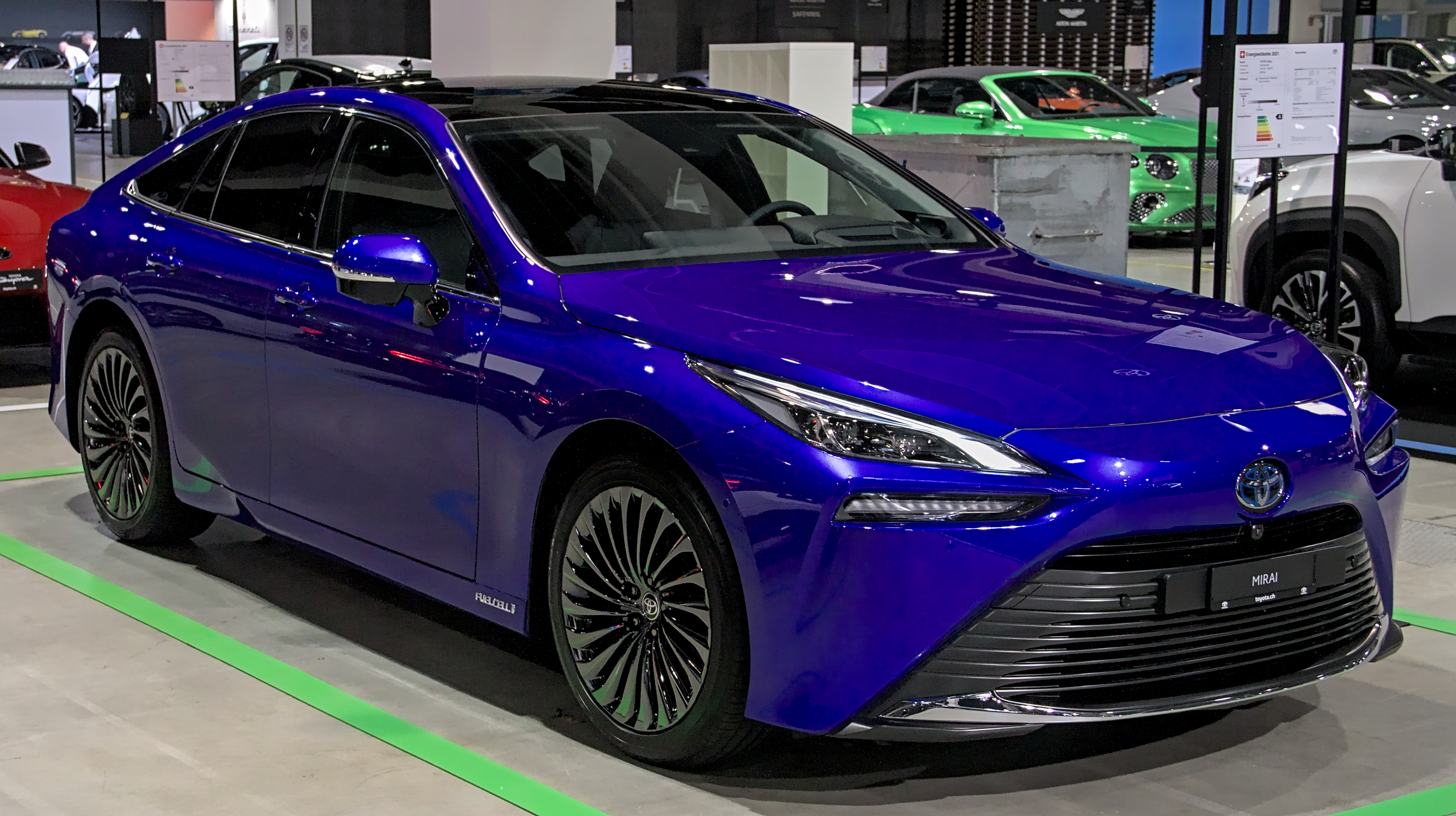
- 2021 Toyota Mirai Limited (Switzerland)

Overview
- Model code: JPD20
- Production: December 2020 – present
- Model years: 2021–present

Body and chassis
- Layout: Rear-motor, rear-wheel-drive
- Platform: TNGA: GA-N
- Related: Toyota Crown (S230)

Powertrain
- Electric motor: 4JM fuel cell-powered 182 hp (136 kW; 185 PS), 300 N⋅m (220 lbf⋅ft)
- Transmission: 1-speed
- Battery: 1.2 kWh lithium-ion
- Range: 647 km (402 mi) (EPA) 141 liters (3 x hydrogen tanks)

Dimensions
- Wheelbase: 2,920 mm (115.0 in)
- Length: 4,975 mm (195.9 in)
- Width: 1,885 mm (74.2 in)
- Height: 1,470 mm (57.9 in)
- Curb weight: 1,920–1,950 kg (4,230–4,300 lb)

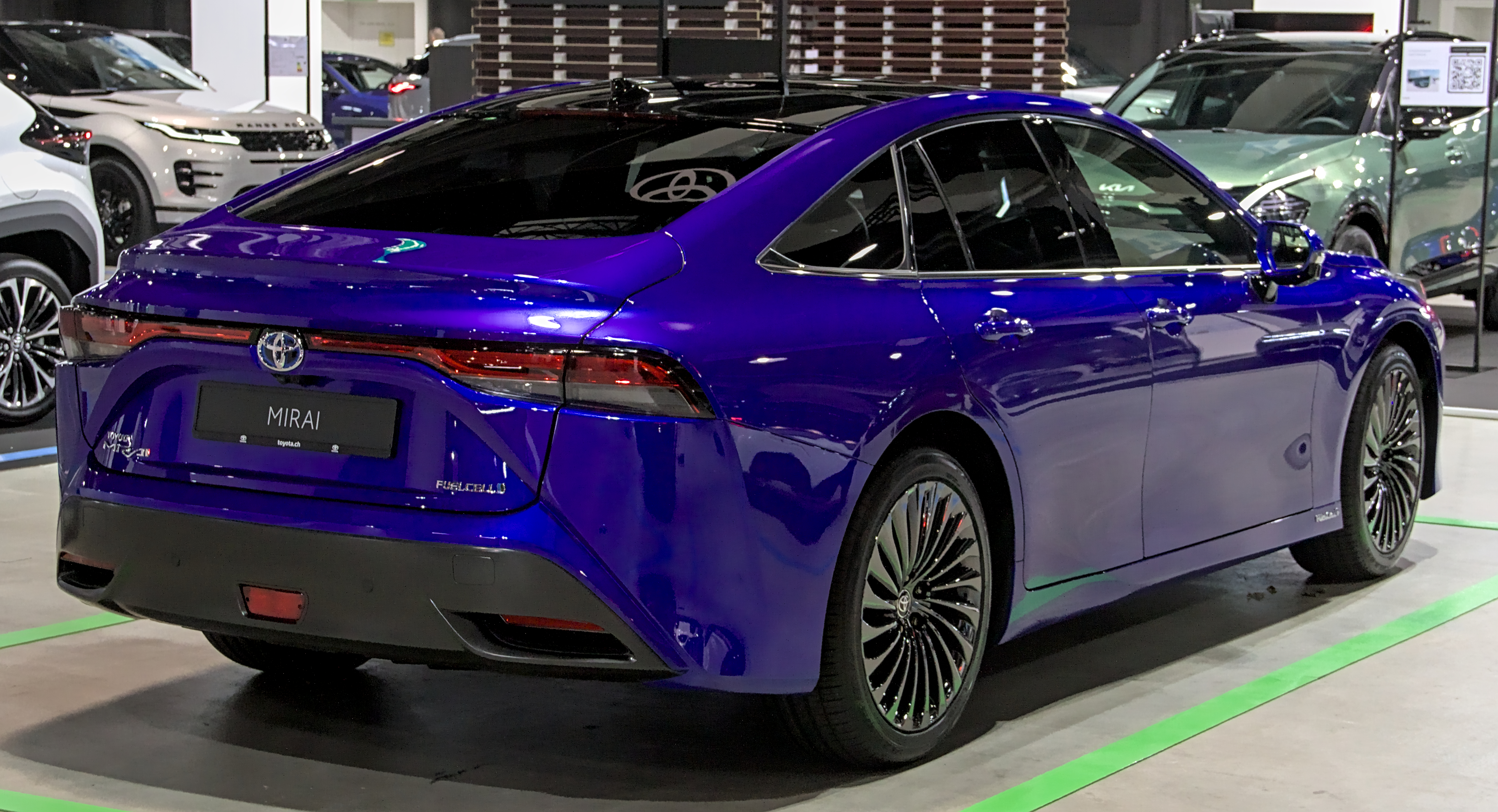
Rear view

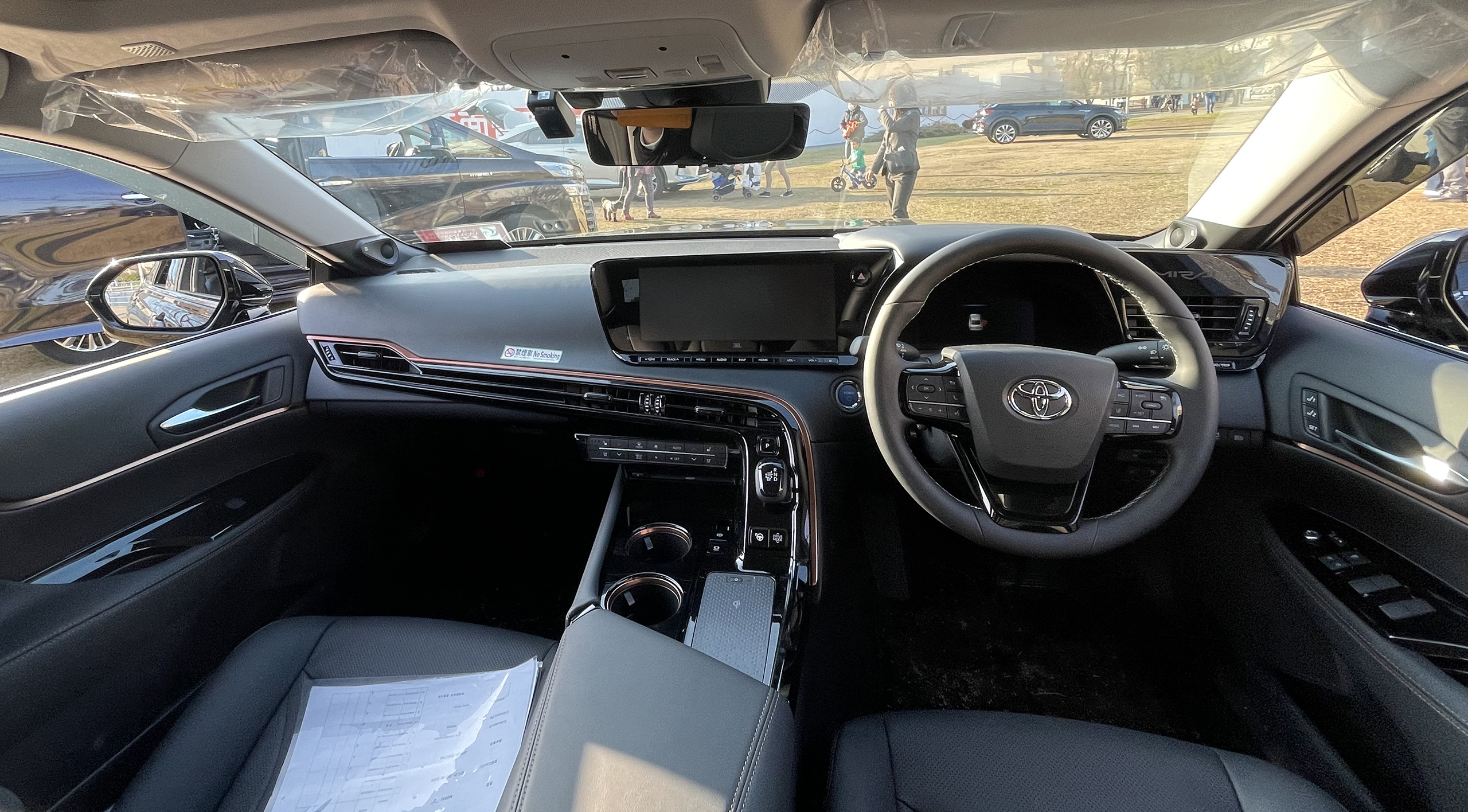
Interior

The second-generation Mirai was unveiled in October 2019 and went on sale in December 2020. It has a target of 30 percent increase in driving range with increased hydrogen capacity.

In April 2021, Toyota announced that it would offer its "Teammate" level 2 driver assistance system on Mirai. The system offers two modes, Advanced Drive and Advanced Park. Advanced Drive provides "hands off" driving on supported roads with a driver monitoring system verifying that the operator keeps their eyes on the road. Advanced Park is an advanced parking assistance system.

In March 2023, the Mirai received a new infotainment system.

=== Safety ===
==== Euro NCAP ====
In September 2021, the second-generation Mirai achieved a five star Euro NCAP overall rating.

The car received a score of 33.8 points (88%) for adults, 42 points (85%) for children occupants, 43.7 points (80%) for pedestrians and 13.2 points (82%) for safety assist.

Euro NCAP test results Toyota Mirai (2021)
Test	Points	%
Overall:	5 /5 stars	
Adult occupant:	33.8	88%
Child occupant:	42	85%
Pedestrian:	43.7	80%
Safety assist:	13.2	82%

==== ANCAP ====
ANCAP test results Toyota Mirai (2021, aligned with Euro NCAP)
Test	Points	%
Overall:	5 /5 stars	
Adult occupant:	33.81	88%
Child occupant:	42.81	87%
Pedestrian:	43.67	80%
Safety assist:	13.41	83%

== Infrastructure ==
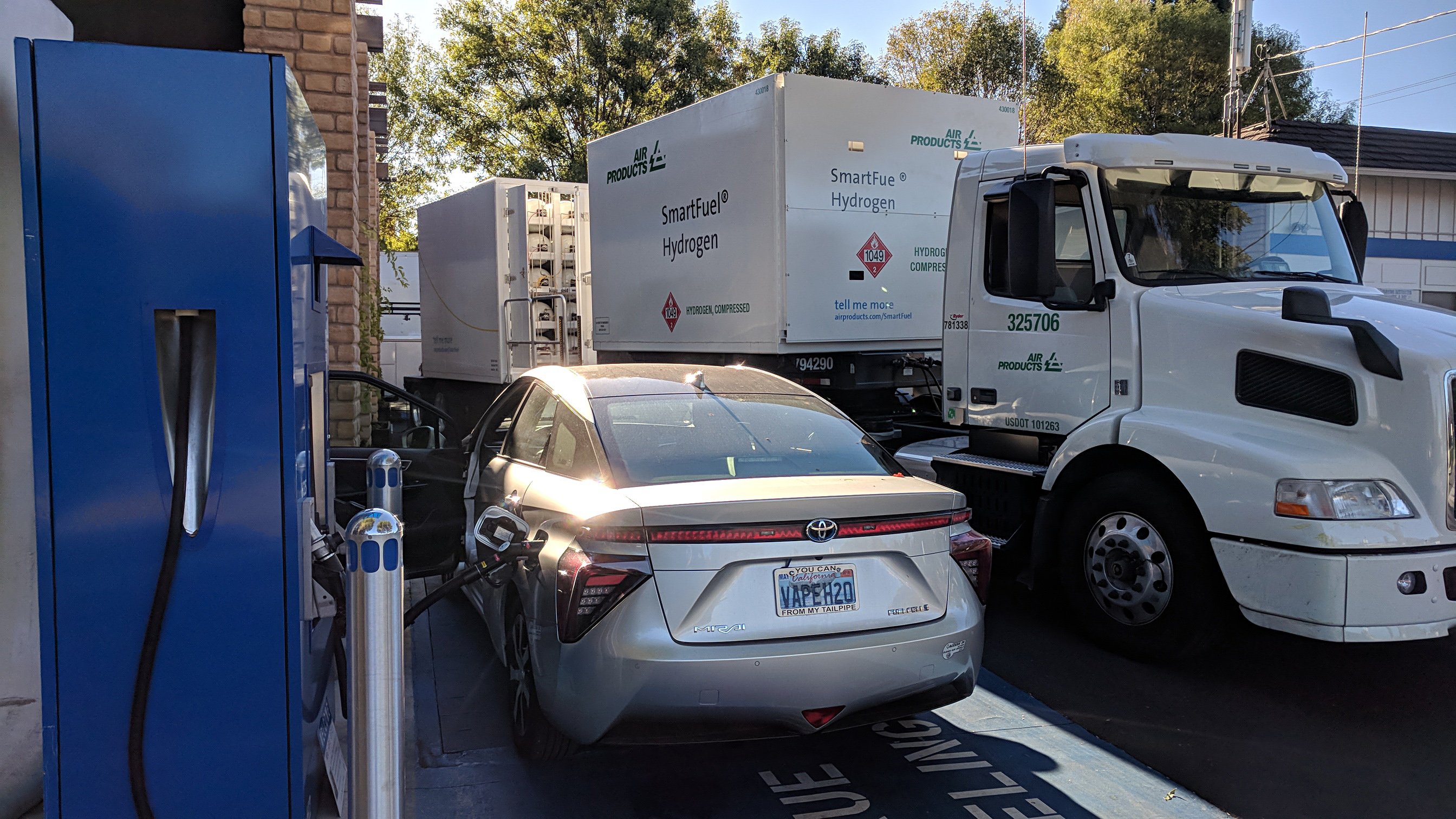
The Saratoga, California, True Zero hydrogen fueling station, filling a Toyota Mirai while the station is being refilled by an Air Products SmartFuel Hydrogen delivery truck

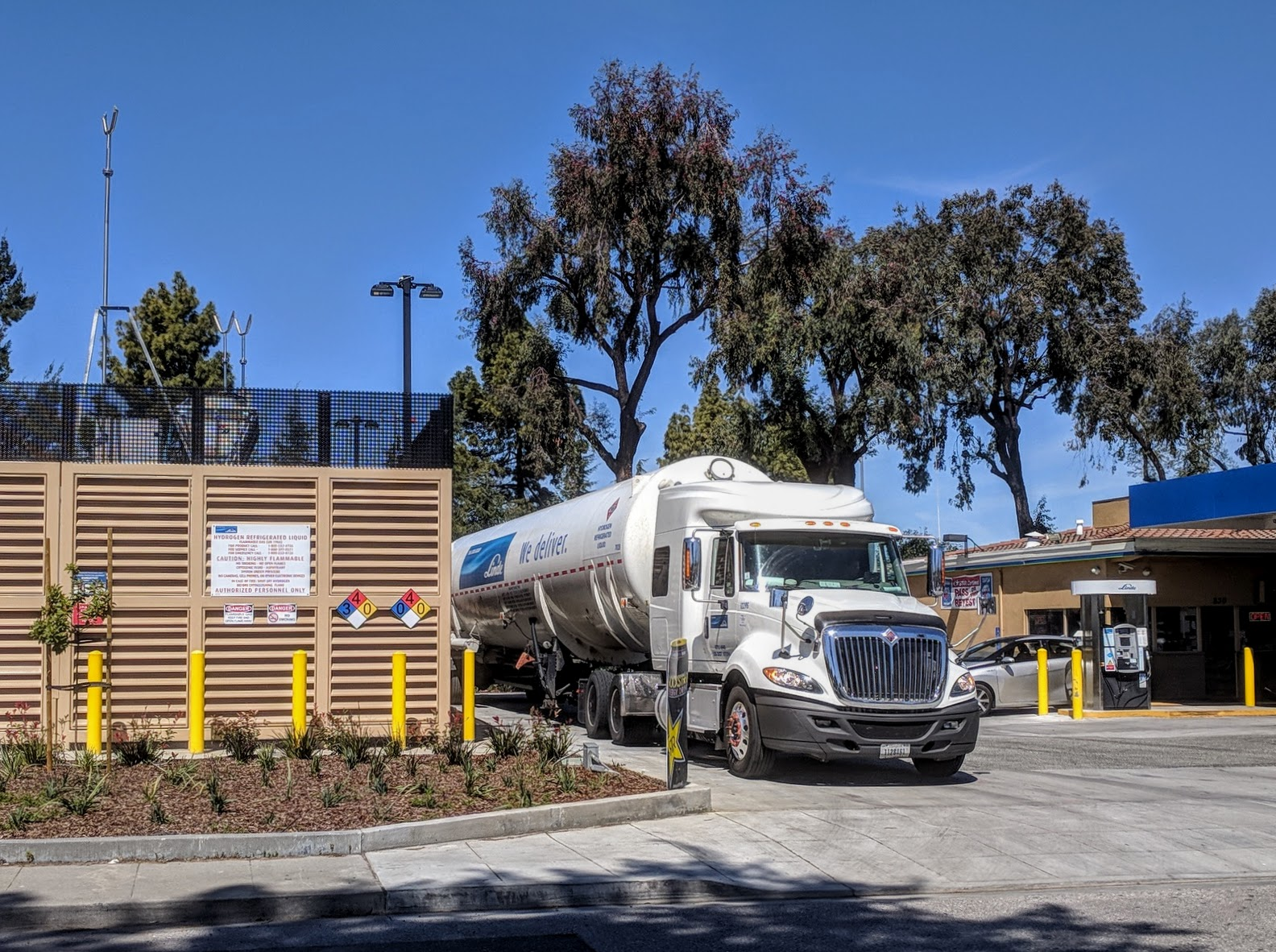
The Linde hydrogen fuel station in Mountain View, California, with Linde liquid-hydrogen delivery truck, and a Toyota Mirai fueling up

As of January 2013, Japan had ten demonstration hydrogen fueling stations. Toyota operated three of these stations. To support commercialization of hydrogen fuel-cell vehicles by Toyota and other manufacturers, the Japanese government announced a goal to build approximately 100 hydrogen fueling stations by March 2016 in Japanese cities where the vehicles were to be launched initially. By May 2016, there were approximately 80 hydrogen fueling stations in Japan.

California had ten hydrogen fueling stations in 2015, and the government provided about $47 million for 28 additional stations there. As of December, 2017, there are 19 True Zero hydrogen stations and 33 total hydrogen stations operating in California.

As of 2023, the province of British Columbia in Canada has 3 hydrogen stations in Metro Vancouver, one in Victoria and one station in Kelowna.

== Production ==
Production of the fuel cell parts began in the Toyota Boshoku factory in November 2014.

== Markets and sales ==
Year	US	Japan	Global
2015	72	412	507
2016	1,034	950	2046
2017	1,838	768	2741
2018	1,700	583	2457
2019	1,502	662	2494
2020	499	789	1770
2021	2,629	2447	5918
2022	2,094	848	3924
2023	2,737	448	4023
2024 (until Nov)	245	661	1702

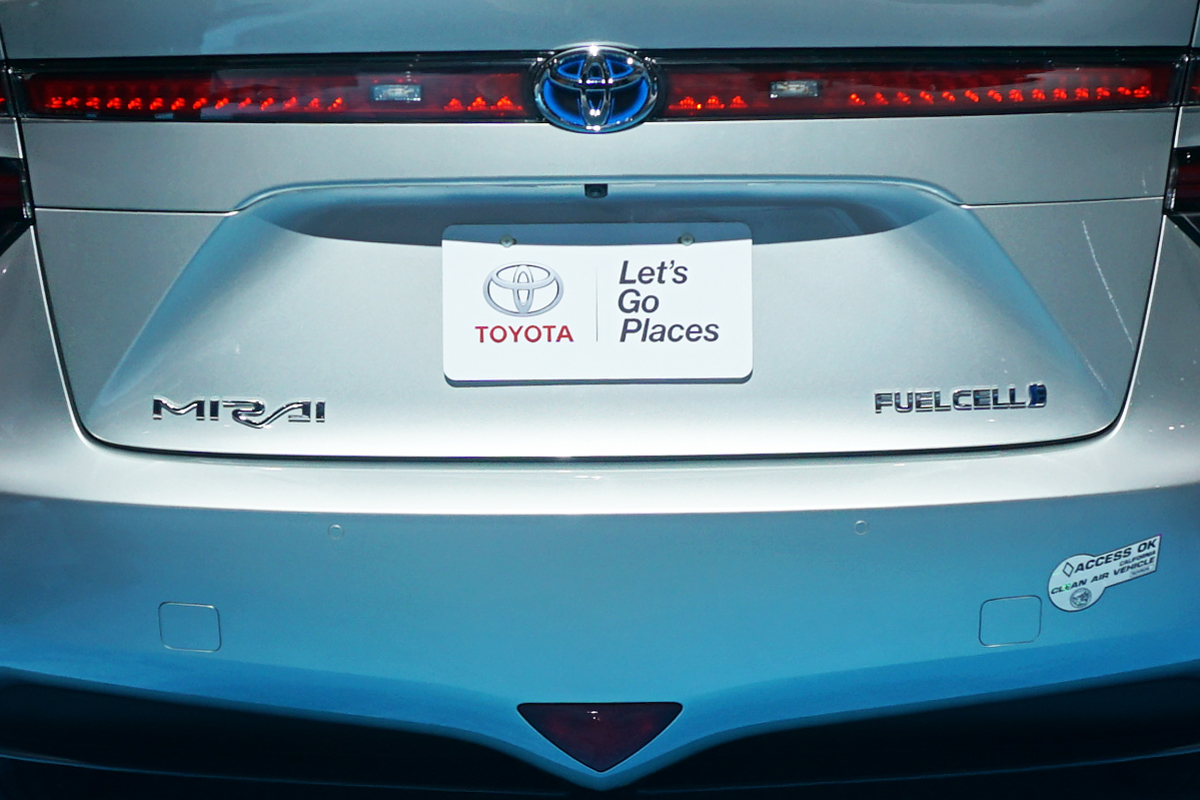
Rear badging of the American Toyota Mirai with California's white HOV lane access sticker

As of December 2017, global sales totaled 5,300 Mirais. The top selling markets were the U.S. with 2,900 units, Japan with 2,100 and Europe with 200.

=== Japan ===
Sales in Japan began on 15 December 2014. Pricing starts at ¥6,700,000 (~US$57,400) before taxes and a government incentive of ¥2,000,000 (~US$19,600). Initially sales are limited to government and corporate customers. As of December 2014, domestic orders had already reached over 400 Mirais, surpassing Japan's first-year sales target, and as a result, there is a waiting list of more than a year.

The Japanese government also provides a subsidy of 50% of the installation costs, with ¥7,200,000,000 (~US$61.7 million) allocated for fiscal year 2014. A hydrogen station in Japan costs ¥280,000,000 (~US$2.4 million), which is about ¥150,000,000 (~US$1.29 million) more than in Europe, which allows more generic materials.

Toyota delivered the first market placed Mirai to the Prime Minister's Official Residence and announced it received 1,500 orders in Japan in one month after sales began on 15 December 2014, against a sales target of 400 for 12 months. By mid-February 2017, about 1,500 Mirais have been sold in Japan, and a total of about 2,100 at the end of 2017.

=== United States ===
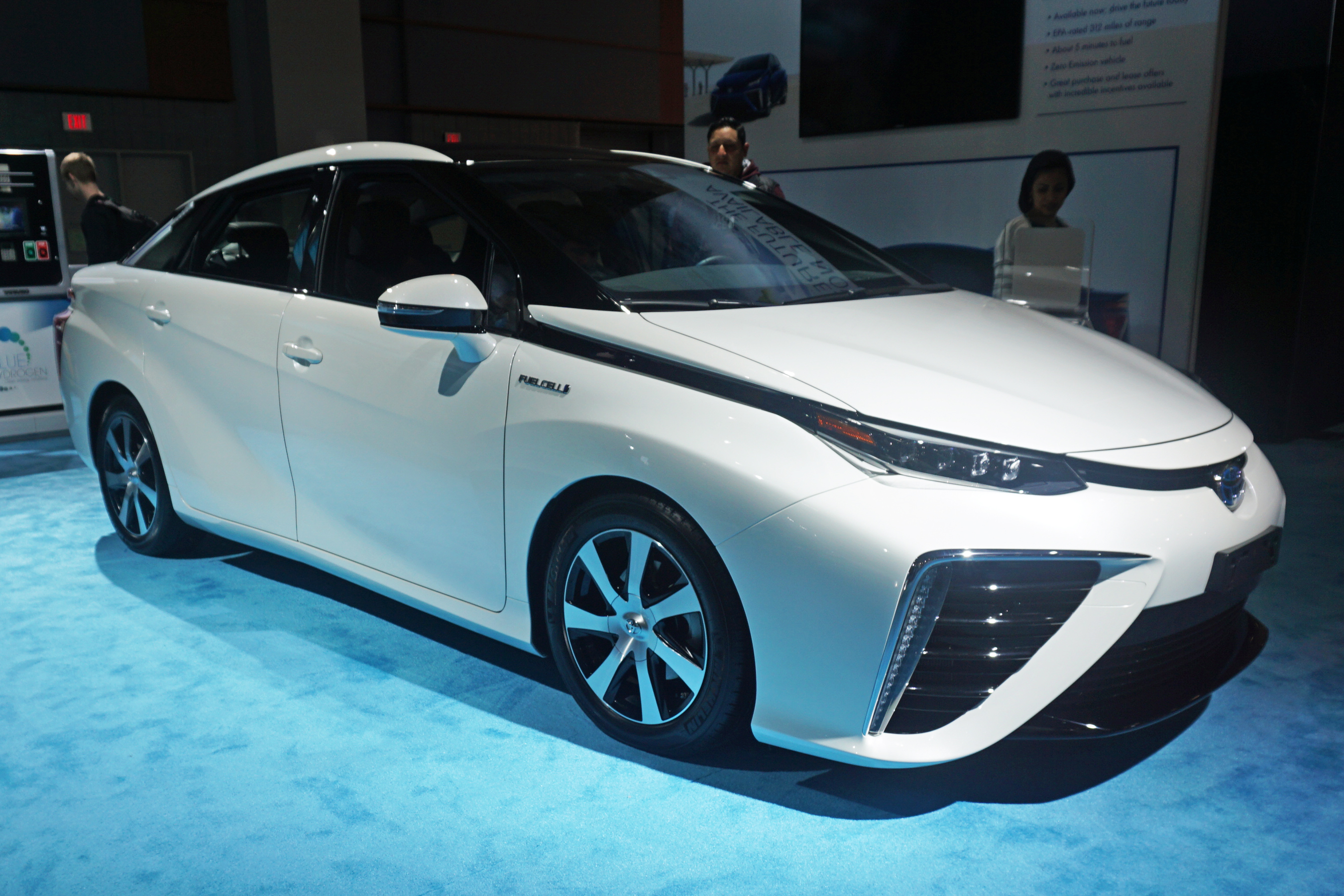
Retail deliveries of the Mirai in the U.S. began in October 2015.

The first 57 units were delivered to retail customers in California in October and November 2015. Toyota hoped to release the Mirai in the five Northeastern States in the first half of 2016, but hydrogen fueling infrastructure was not built in the region. Toyota committed to provide free hydrogen fueling for the first three years to initial buyers of the Mirai, as Hyundai did for lessees of its Hyundai Tucson-ix35 Fuel Cell in California.

In the American market, the 2016 model year Toyota Mirai started at US$57,500 before any government incentives, and a leasing option for 36 months was available with a $3,649 down payment and a lease rate of $499 per month. Several states have established incentives and tax exemptions for fuel cell vehicles. As a zero-emission vehicle (ZEV), the Mirai is eligible for a purchase rebate in California of US$5,000 through the Clean Vehicle Rebate Project. The federal tax credit for fuel cell vehicles originally expired on 31 December 2014, but it was retroactively extended through 31 December 2016. By September 2016, Toyota had reduced the down-payment from US$3,649 to US$2,499 and leasing price to US$349/month with several benefits, and sold 710 Mirais.

As of December 2017, U.S. sales totaled about 2,900 Mirais. Sales in California passed the 3,000 unit mark in January 2018, where there were 31 retail hydrogen stations in operation. As of January 2018, Mirai sales represented more than 80% of all hydrogen fuel cell vehicles on the road in the United States.

In 2024, Mirai owners filed a class action lawsuit in California over the lack of availability of hydrogen refueling stations, alleging, among other things, fraudulent concealment and misrepresentation as well as violations of California’s false advertising law and breaches of implied warranty.

=== Canada ===
In January 2018, Toyota Canada announced that the Mirai for the Canadian market would first become available in Quebec, in line with the provincial government's zero-emission vehicle standard adopted the previous month. Previously, a fleet of 50 Mirai vehicles had been internally tested by the Quebec government under the direction of Quebec's Minister of Natural Resources, Pierre Moreau. The first public demonstrations for the vehicle took place at the January 2018 Montreal International Auto Show. Toyota is partnering with, among other agencies, Quebec's Ministry of Energy and Hydro-Québec, to introduce hydrogen fueling infrastructure in the province.

=== Europe ===
The market launch in Europe was in September 2015 and the UK became the first country to sell a Mirai outside Japan delivering the first car to ITM Power. Germany and Denmark were also in the first group of European countries where the Mirai was released, to be followed by additional markets in 2017. In Germany, pricing started at €60,000 (~US$75,140) plus VAT. As of December 2019, the Mirai is available for retail sales across most of Europe including in the UK, Denmark, Germany, Belgium, France, the Netherlands, Italy, Spain, Sweden, and Norway. About 640 Mirai had been sold in Europe by the end of 2019. Copenhagen added 100 taxis in 2021.

Former European Parliament President Pat Cox estimated that Toyota would initially lose between €50,000 and €100,000 (US$60,000 to US$133,000 at 2014 exchange rates) on each Mirai sold in 2015.

== Recognition ==
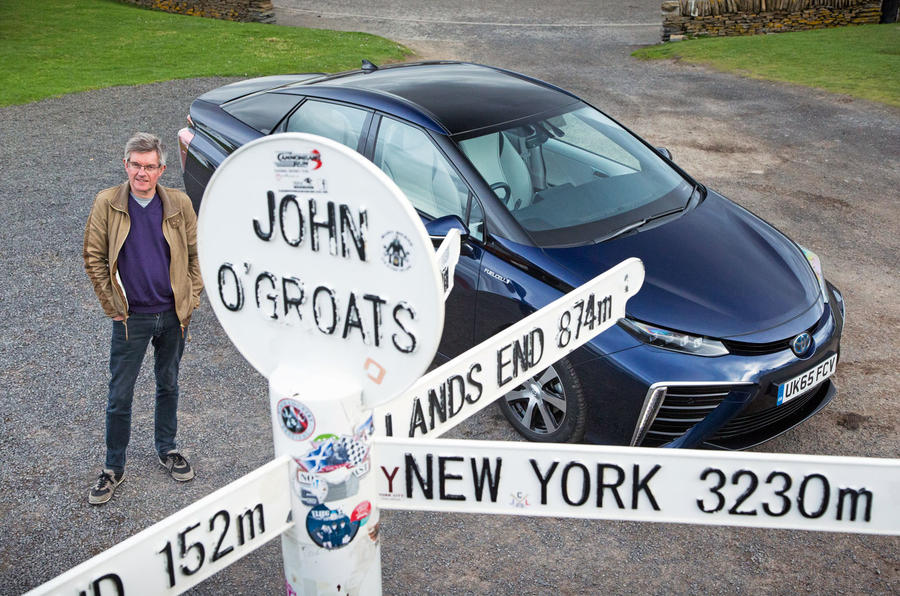
Richard Bremner with the Toyota Mirai the first JOG to LE Hydrogen Fuel Cell Car at John O'Groats

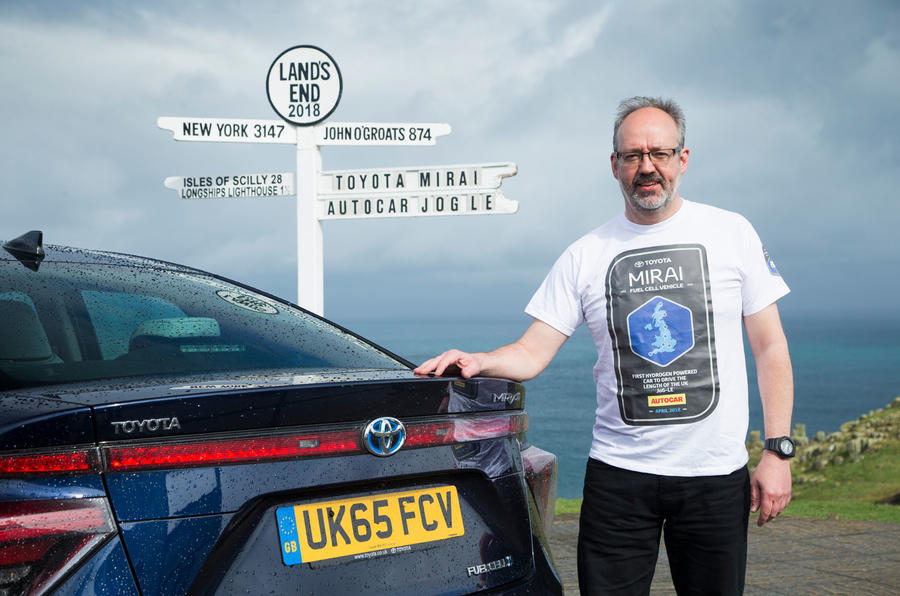
Jon Hunt with the Toyota Mirai the first JOG to LE Hydrogen Fuel Cell Car at Land's End

The Toyota Mirai won the 2016 World Green Car of the Year Award, announced at the 2016 New York International Auto Show.

In April 2018 the Mirai became first hydrogen powered fuel cell electric vehicle to travel the length of Great Britain from John O'Groats in Scotland to Land's End in England (Land's End to John o' Groats), a historic milestone in British motoring. Driven by Richard Bremner and Luc Lacey from Autocar magazine and Jon Hunt from Toyota they started the journey from Kirkwall in the Orkney Islands. To reach the hydrogen refuelling infrastructure at the time they travelled via Aberdeen, Sunderland, Rotherham and Beaconsfield covering 1,785 km (1,109 miles) at an average speed of 90 km/h (56 mph). The journey took 19 hours 40 minutes with hydrogen consumption of 0.9 kg per 100 km (16.1 kg of hydrogen consumed).

The second generation Mirai was awarded in May 2021 by the Hispanic Motor Press for 'Car Technology of the Year', noting the commitments towards zero emissions and Toyota Safety Sense.

== Marketing ==
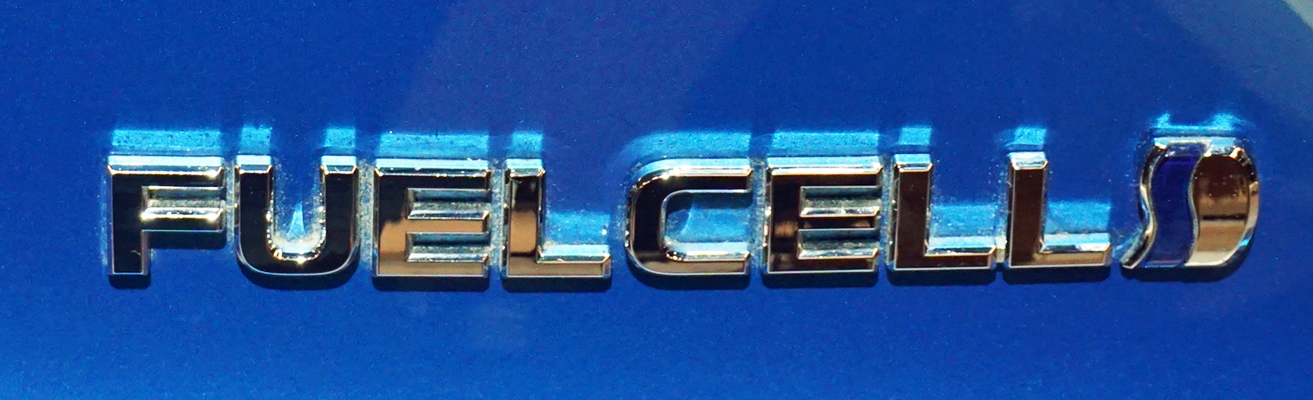
Toyota's "FUEL CELL" badge used in the Mirai

In 2015, Toyota released Fueled By..., a series of video commercials for the Mirai which show how hydrogen to power fuel cells like the ones that Mirais use could come from various unexpected sources. The last commercial, Fueled by the Future, features Michael J. Fox, Christopher Lloyd and YouTube science personality Go Tech Yourself. It recalls the Back to the Future franchise and illustrates how the idea of converting trash into fuel (which had been introduced with the "Mr. Fusion" reactor that Dr. Emmett Brown (Lloyd) had brought back from the future at the end of the first film) had become reality. The commercial was released on 21 October — the same date in 2015 in Back to the Future Part II when Marty McFly (Fox), Jennifer Parker (Claudia Wells/Elisabeth Shue) and Brown traveled.

== Recalls ==
On 15 February 2017 Toyota recalled all of the roughly 2,800 zero-emission Mirai cars on the road due to problems with the output voltage generated by their fuel cell system. According to Toyota, under unique driving conditions, such as if the accelerator pedal is depressed to the wide open throttle position after driving on a long descent while using cruise control, there was a possibility the output voltage generated by the fuel cell boost converter could exceed the maximum voltage. Toyota dealers announced they will update the fuel cell system software at no cost to the customer, claiming the process will take about half an hour.

== Lawsuit ==
In June 2023, Toyota Motor Corporation was sued in the United States District Court for the Central District of California over alleged defects in the hydrogen fuel cell system of the Toyota Mirai. Plaintiffs claim that the system can suffer from sudden power losses, posing safety risks. They allege that Toyota knew about these issues but did not disclose them to consumers. The lawsuit, represented by Jason M. Ingber of the Ingber Law Group, seeks compensation for damages, including vehicle costs, repairs, and refunds, as well as an injunction to address the defects.

Toyota has denied the allegations, asserting that the Mirai meets all safety and performance standards and that any issues are isolated incidents.

As of June 2024, the lawsuit is ongoing, with both parties engaged in pre-trial activities.

== See also ==
- List of fuel cell vehicles
- Toyota FCHV
- Toyota FINE series
