= Fyne (disambiguation) =

Fyne may refer to:

- Loch Fyne in Scotland
- Loch Fyne (Greenland)
- HMS Loch Fyne (K429)
- Loch Fyne Restaurants, a UK seafood restaurant chain named after the loch
- Fyne Court in Somerset, UK
- Fyne Times, a lifestyle magazine
- Fyne (software), a cross-platform graphical toolkit using Go

== See also ==
- Fiennes
- Fine (disambiguation)
- Fynes
