= Intervention (album) =

Studio album by Finest Hour
- Released: March 21, 2007
- Recorded: Gig 2 Me Studio; Lancaster, California
- Genre: Metalcore
- Label: Divenia Records
- Producer: Adam Vez (Razorblade Music Group)

Intervention is the debut full-length album by metalcore band Finest Hour, released on March 21, 2007 over the Label Divenia Records.

== Reception ==
The band promoted his debut album in his Tour from April to May 2007 in the United States. The limited promo CD was released on 26 November 2006 as "Are You Ready For A War?".

=== Release ===
The band released first time the copies for his album via his homepage and released his CD in stores on 21 March 2007 over Divenia Records.

== Track listing ==
1. Fall to My Knees (06:11)
2. The Dead Will Fall (04:22)
3. Let's Burn This City (04:26)
4. Nameless (03:55)
5. The Structure (04:43)
6. Just Before He Dies
7. Cry Forgiveness (04:08)
8. The Sky Is Falling
9. A Way Away
10. All Lights Fade
11. Save Yourself
12. Consuming the Darkness
