= Coarse topology =

In mathematics, coarse topology is a term in comparison of topologies which specifies the partial order relation of a topological structure to other one(s).

Specifically, the coarsest topology may refer to:

- Initial topology, the most coarse topology in a certain category of topologies
- Trivial topology, the most coarse topology possible on a given set

== See also ==
- Weak topology, an example of topology coarser than the standard one
- Fine topology (disambiguation)
