= Toyota Fuel Cell Hybrid Vehicle-Advanced =

The Toyota Fuel Cell Hybrid Vehicle-Advanced (FCHV-adv) is a fuel cell vehicle based on the first generation Toyota FCHV.

The proposed FCHV-adv uses four hydrogen fuel tanks, which store high-pressure compressed hydrogen at up to 70 MPa (10,000 psi; 700 bar) and feed it into a fuel stack to produce electricity via a chemical reaction between hydrogen and oxygen. This electricity then powers an electric motor, capable of 90 kW (122 PS; 121 hp) and 260 N⋅m (27 kg⋅m; 192 lb⋅ft), and charges a nickel–metal hydride battery. Cruising range is approximately 760–830 km (472–516 miles) and the top speed is stated to be 155 km/h (96 mph).

Between 2010 and 2013, Toyota wanted to introduce over 100 FCHV-adv vehicles to "universities, private companies and government agencies as well as government agencies in both California and New York." This, in Toyota's opinion, would allow infrastructure for fuel cell technology to grow until the market release in 2015.

On September 1, 2008, Toyota began leasing FCHV-adv vehicles to the Japanese Ministry of the Environment for ¥840,000/month for 30 months.

On June 4, 2014, Toyota announced plans to begin production of Toyota Mirai fuel cell vehicles by mid-December 2014. The Mirai launched in the US on October 21, 2015.
