= Finest =

Finest or The Finest may refer to:

== Albums ==
- Finest (The Proclaimers album), 2003
- The Finest (Fine Young Cannibals album), 1996
- Finest, by Liza Minnelli, 2009
- Finest, by Ultravox, 2004
- The Finest, by Dead Poetic, 2007

== Songs ==
- "Finest" (song), by YoungBoy Never Broke Again, 2025
- "The Finest" (song), by the S.O.S. Band, 1986

== See also ==
- Finest hour (disambiguation)
- Finest Moments (disambiguation)
