= Finest hour =

The term "finest hour" originated in the 1940 speech This was their finest hour by Winston Churchill.

Finest hour may also refer to:

== Books ==
- The Finest Hours: The True Story of a Heroic Sea Rescue, a book by Michael J. Tougias which was adapted for the namesake 2016 film
- Their Finest Hour, the second volume of the first hardcover edition of The Second World War (book series), Winston Churchill's history of World War II

== Music ==
- Finest Hour (album), a 2011 album by comedian Patton Oswalt
- Finest Hour (band), an American hardcore punk band
- Finest Hour (quartet), a barbershop quartet
- "Finest Hour", a song by the power metal band Borealis from the 2011 album Fall from Grace
- "Finest Hour", a song by Jay Rock from the 2011 album Follow Me Home
- "Finest Hour", a 2018 song by the electronic group Cash Cash featuring Abir

== Films ==
- The Finest Hours (1964 film), a 1964 documentary based on the above speech
- The Finest Hour (1992 film), a 1992 war-drama film
- The Finest Hours (2016 film), a 2016 American film directed by Craig Gillespie

== Games ==
- Call of Duty: Finest Hour, first-person shooter for the Xbox, PlayStation 2 and GameCube by Spark Unlimited
- Finest Hour (arcade game), Japan-only 1989 arcade game by Namco
- Hearts of Iron III: Their Finest Hour, an expansion pack for Hearts of Iron III
- Their Finest Hour (video game), air combat video game by Lucasfilm Games
- Their Finest Hour, a 1976 board wargame in the Europa series
