= Toyota FCHV =

Hybrid hydrogen fuel cell vehicles

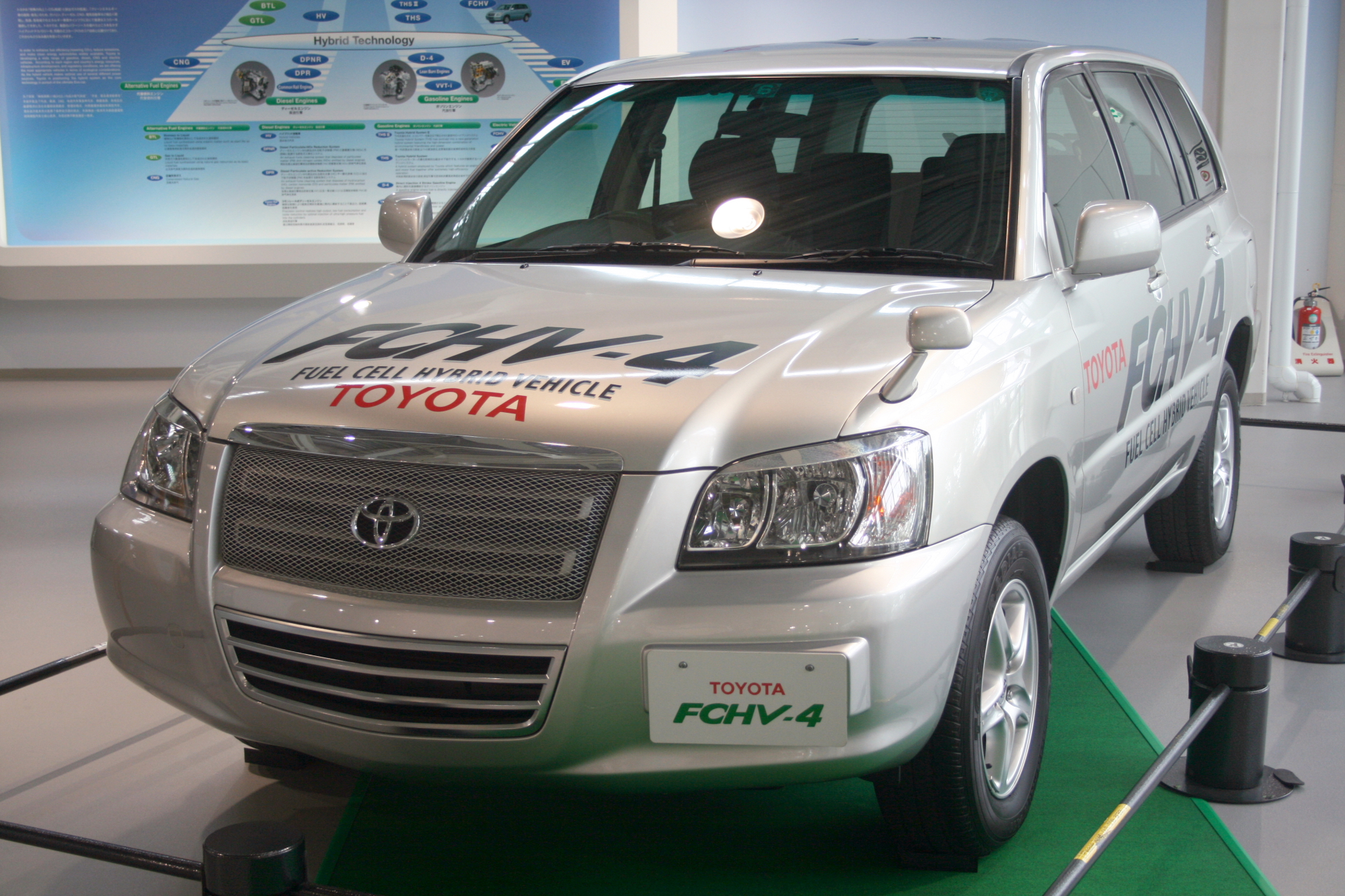
Toyota FCHV-4 SUV circa 2007.

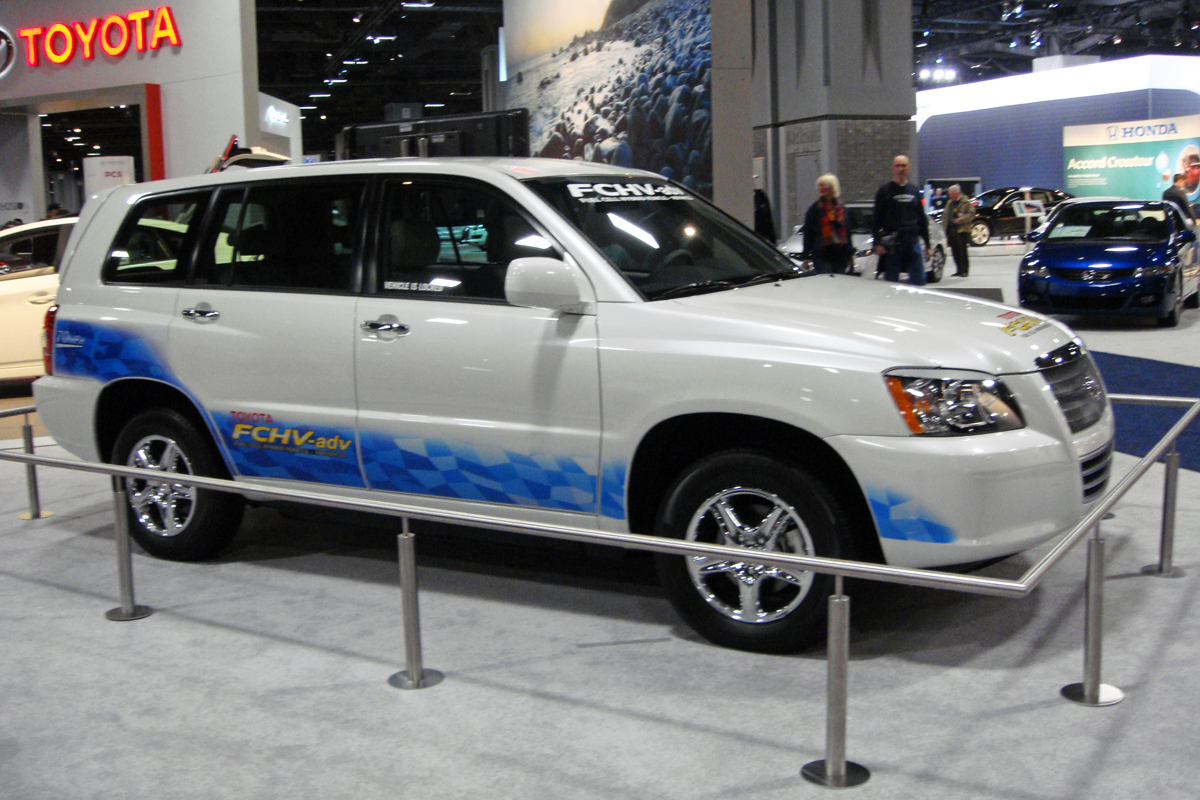
Toyota FCHV-adv SUV at the 2010 Washington Auto Show.

The Toyota FCHV is a hybrid hydrogen fuel cell vehicle development programme of the Toyota Motor Corporation, which was leased to a limited number of drivers in the United States and Japan beginning in 2002. The Toyota FCHV and Honda FCX, which began leasing on 2 December 2002, became the world's first government-certified commercial hydrogen fuel cell vehicles. Its first commercial fuel cell vehicle was developed from the FCHV-4, which was adapted from the Toyota Highlander body. "FCHV" stands for "Fuel Cell Hybrid Vehicle". A number of prototypes have been produced, up to the latest FCHV-adv ("advanced").

== History ==
There are six generations of FCHVs for testing. The FCHV-1, introduced in 1996, was Toyota's first fuel cell vehicle, based on the Toyota RAV4 and equipped with a hydrogen-absorbing alloy storage unit. The FCHV-2, introduced in 1997, was equipped with a reformer to extract hydrogen from methanol. FCHV-3, 4, and 5, introduced in 2001, were based on the Toyota Highlander, and FCHV-3 and 4 were capable of generating four times more power than FCHV-1. The FCHV-4 was the first fuel cell vehicle to be tested on public roads in Japan, and driving tests continued until 2004. The Clean Hydrocarbon Fuel (CHF) reformer of the FCHV-5 was equipped with a newly developed catalyst and heat exchanger to improve acceleration and fuel economy.

As of 2008 the FCHV-adv was available for lease in Japan. The use of the vehicles by government ministries and companies is intended to provide detailed development feedback on the FCHV performance under varied driving conditions.

In 2007 a FCHV was driven 560 km (350 mi) between Osaka and Tokyo on a single tank of hydrogen, proving that a hydrogen vehicle could compete with conventional vehicles for range. In August 2009, Toyota USA announced an estimated FCHV-adv range of 690 km (430 mi) from a 6 kg (13 lb) tank of hydrogen, based on a 331.5-mile (533.5 km) test trip in "real-world" conditions between Torrance and San Diego, California.

== FCHV system ==
The FCHV designs are based on the first generation Highlander SUV, although a bus version is also in development. The powertrain consists of a 90 kW fuel cell supplied from onboard compressed hydrogen tanks, and a nickel–metal hydride battery in parallel. Battery and fuel cell can provide power to the 90 kW driving motors either singly or together. The mechanism is very similar to the Hybrid Synergy Drive in the Toyota Prius and Toyota Auris HSD but with the fuel cell replacing the petrol internal combustion engine, thus minimising greenhouse gas emissions at point of use.

At low speeds the FCHV can run on battery alone, with a range of about 50 km (31 mi). For high performance, such as when accelerating from rest, the fuel cell and battery supply power in tandem. The battery can also charge by regenerative braking, improving overall efficiency.

=== Hydrogen storage ===
The 700 Bar (10000 PSI) hydrogen tanks holds 156 liters - enough fuel for a range of 830 kilometers (520 mi) on the Japanese 10-15 test cycle and 760 kilometers (470 mi) on the Japanese JC08 test cycle. Test vehicles on the Japanese 10-15 test cycle average 22.7 kilometers per hour (14.1 mph) with a top speed of 70 kilometers per hour (43 mph). Vehicles on the JC08 test cycle average 24.4 kilometers per hour (15.2 mph) and a top speed of 81.6 kilometers per hour (50.7 mph).

== Models ==
=== FCHV-BUS ===
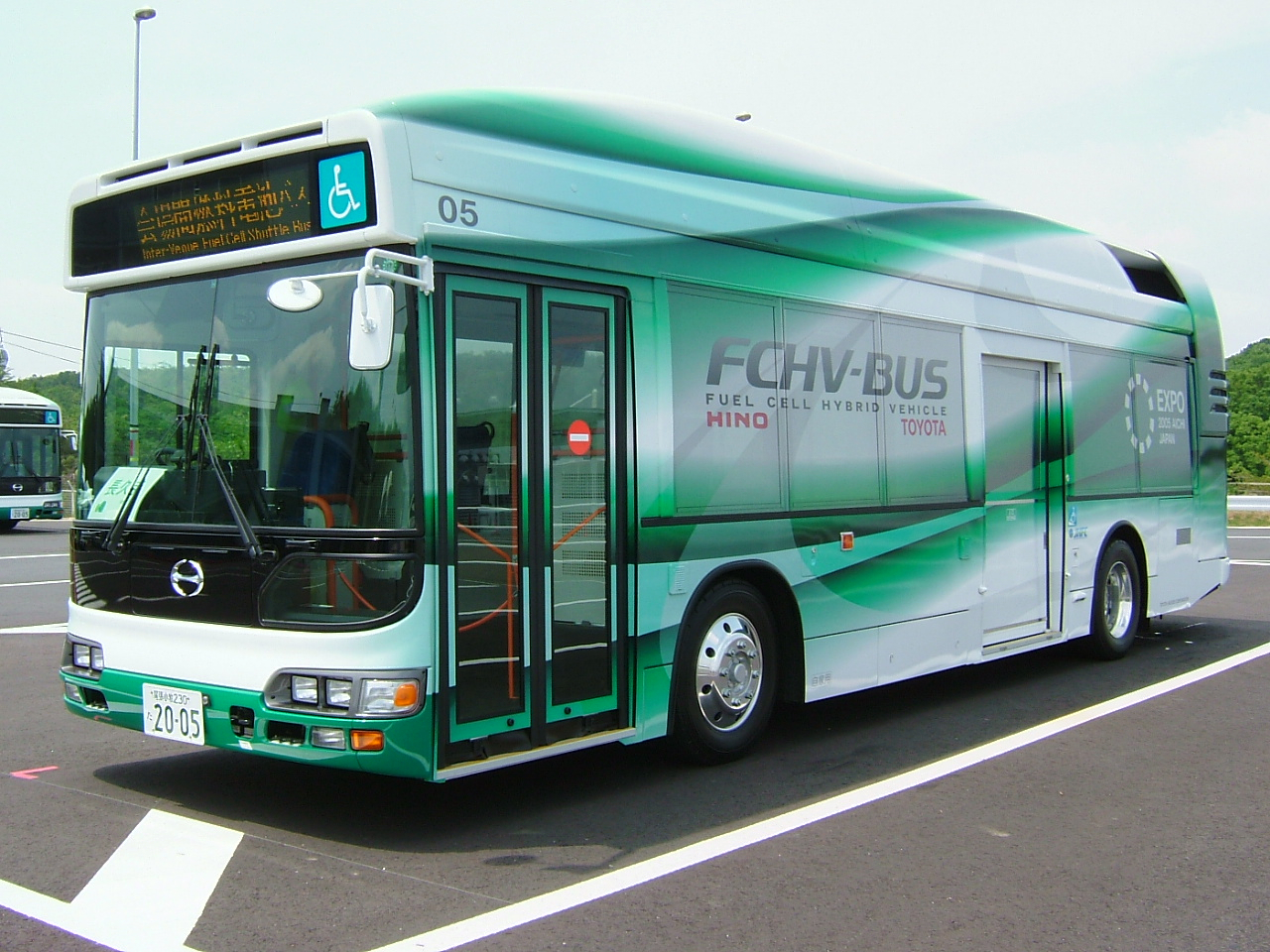
Toyota's FCHV-BUS at the Expo 2005

The Toyota FCHV-BUS is a fuel cell bus based on the Hino Blue Ribbon City(KL-HU2PMEE) low-floor bus.

- 90 kW PEFC Fuel cell stack: twice
- Motor: AC synchronous 80 kW twice
- Hydrogen tank: Compressed hydrogen gas 35 MPa / 150 liter, five (version 2002) or seven (version 2005)
- Passenger capacity: 63 (included 22 seats)

FCHV-BUS demonstrated at Toei Bus (August 2003 - December 2004) and Expo 2005. After Expo 2005, some were lent to bus fleet operators, and also demonstrated in fuel cell events.

- Chita Noriai (March 2006 - December 2009) as route bus in Chubu International Airport
- Chubu International Airport (since July 2006) as ramp bus
- Meitetsu Bus (since October 2010) as route bus in Toyota City, Aichi
- Airport Transport Service (since December 2010) as airport shuttle bus for Tokyo International Airport

=== FC Bus ===
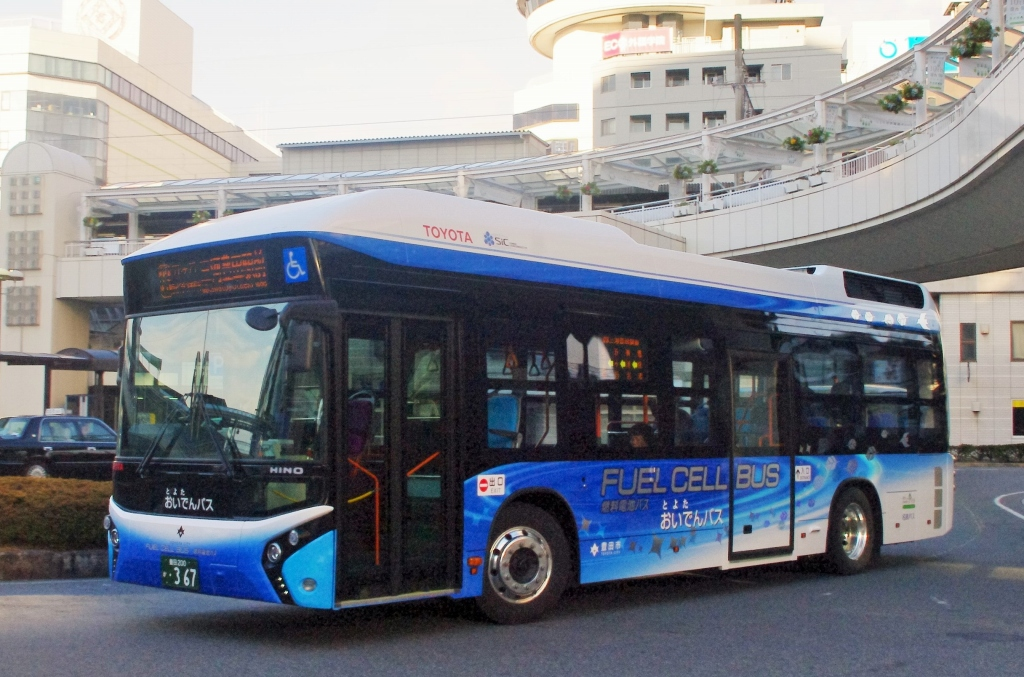
Toyota FC Bus

The FC Bus uses the Toyota Fuel Cell System (TFCS) in a bus, based on experience with Hino on the Hino Blue Ribbon bus.

In 2015, the bus was lent to Meitetsu Bus for free, as a demonstration that fuel cell buses were practical. It was used on the Toyota City Community Bus Oiden Bus Toyota East Circle Line (Section：Toyotashi Station ↔ Mikawa-Toyota Station). In September on 2015, the bus started running Toyota Oiden Bus Fujioka・Toyota Line (Section：Toyotashi Station ↔ Fujioka Elementary School).

Toyota planned to start sales in 2017 and to have 100 units in Tokyo in time for the 2020 Olympics. The bus was delivered to Toei Bus on lease contract.

=== SORA ===
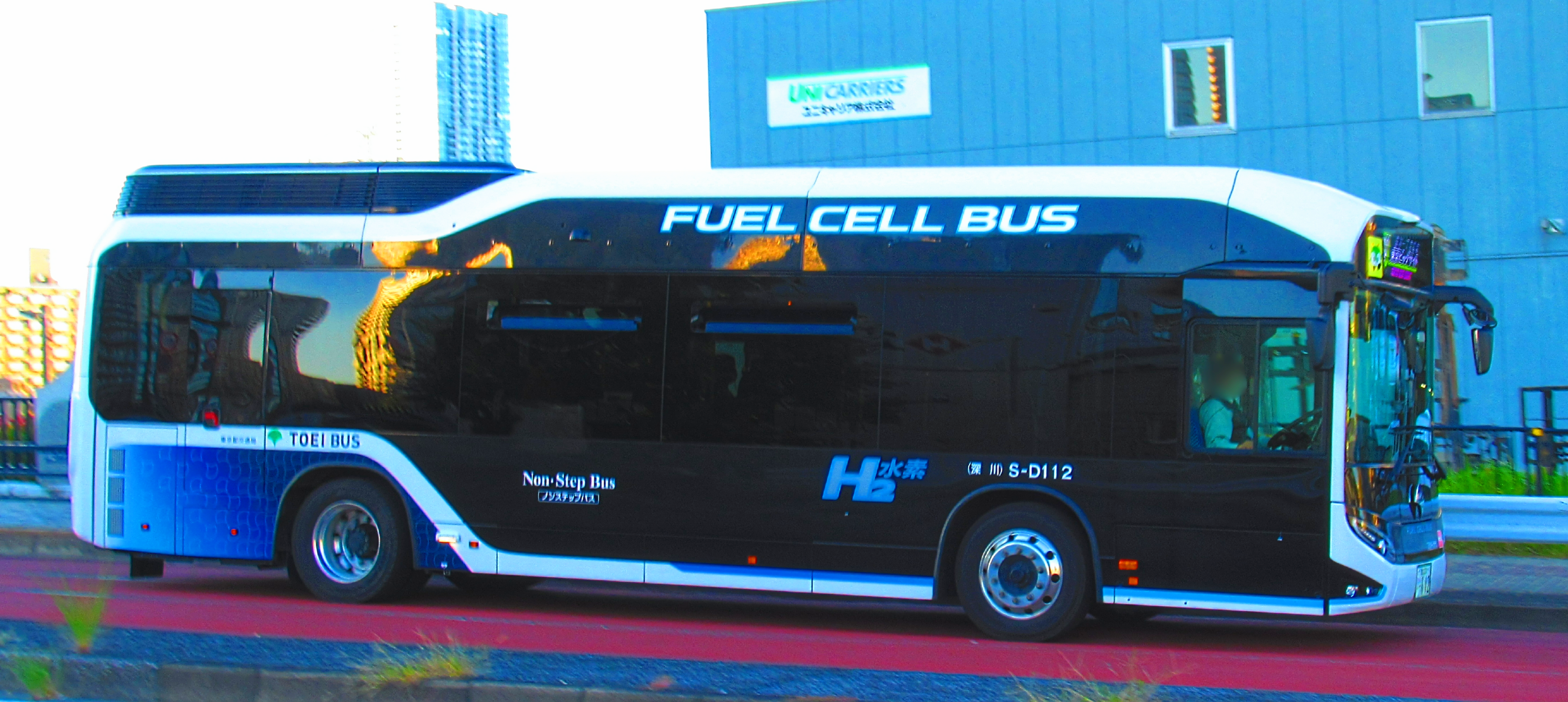
Fuel Cell Bus / Toei Bus

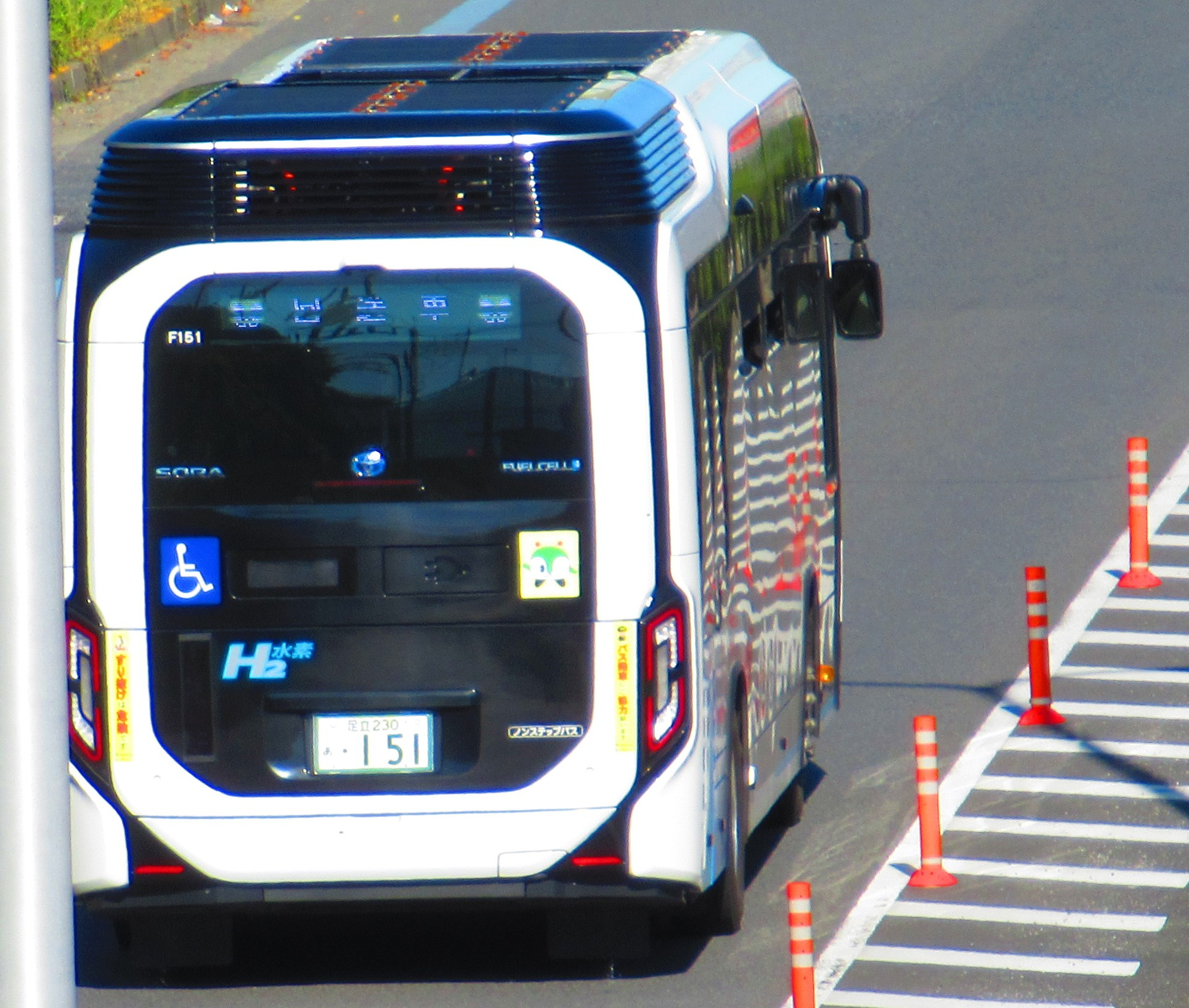
Fuel Cell Bus / Toei Bus

The Toyota SORA bus will be made from 2018. The name "SORA" stands for Sky, Ocean, River, Air, which is the water cycle. It includes a Toyota Fuel Cell System (TFCS) and a collision warning system. It has a capacity of up to 79 people. The seats can also stow automatically when not in use. It also uses LED lights to communicate with other buses and travel in convoys to conserve energy. They can also be used as an emergency power source, having up to 235 kWh (850 MJ).

=== Project Portal trucks ===
Toyota started testing two Mirai fuel cells (114 kW each) in a converted Kenworth T680 electric Class 8 semi-trailer truck in the Port of Los Angeles in April 2017 as part of 'Project Portal', doing drayage for Toyota. The truck has two motors for a combined 500 kW (670 hp) and 1,795 N⋅m (1,325 lb⋅ft) of torque, a 200 kW 12 kWh battery, and a fixed gear ratio of 15.5:1. It has a range of 320 km (200 mi) determined by the size of the hydrogen tanks. It accelerates (empty) from 0–97 km/h (0–60 mph) in 7 seconds. The motors are mainly powered by the fuel cells rather than from the small battery.

Toyota added a terminal tractor to the project in 2019. The project was updated with a 480 km (300 miles) truck in 2020.

== Cultural impact ==
=== Prophets of Science Fiction ===
The FCHV is featured in the Jules Verne episode of the Science Channel program Prophets of Science Fiction. Some measure of credit is given to Jules Verne in the episode, for helping to inspire the idea.

== See also ==
- List of fuel cell vehicles
- Toyota FINE
  - Fine-S
  - Fine-N
  - Fine-T
  - Fine-X
- Toyota Mirai
  - Toyota FCV-R
  - Toyota FCV
