= Toyota Fine =

The Toyota Fine (Fuel cell INnovation Emotion) or FINE, is a series of concept cars from the Toyota Motor Corporation which use fuel cell technology.

== Models ==
These models include:

- Toyota Fine-S (2003) FINE-Sport
- Toyota Fine-N (2003)
- Toyota Fine-X (2005) FINE-eXperiment
- Toyota Fine-T (2005)
- Toyota Fine-Comfort Ride Concept (2017)

== See also ==
- Toyota concept vehicles
- List of Toyota vehicles
- Toyota FCHV Fuel Cell Hybrid Vehicle
- Toyota FCV Fuel Cell Vehicle
- Toyota Mirai Fuel cell production vehicle
