= Finest Hour (band) =

American band

- Origin: Palmdale, California, United States
- Genres: Indie rock Hardcore punk Screamo
- Years active: since 2005
- Label: Divenia
- Members: Drew Morelock; Josh Neufeld; Erik Gustafson; Ryan Morelock; Jesse Mallet

Finest Hour is an American Metalcore band formed 2005 in Palmdale, California, United States.

== History ==
The band was founded on 26 January 2005 in Lancaster, California. The debut album Intervention was released in 2007 over the Label Divenia Records. The members of the heavy band are from Palmdale and played 2009 three songs live in the Flash Rock webcast show at Flashrock Studios.

== Members ==
=== Current line-up ===
- Drew Morelock - Guitar, Lead Strings, Vocals
- Josh Neufeld - Keyboard, Samples
- Erik Gustafson - Guitar, Lead Vocals
- Ryan Morelock - Bass, Strings, Vocals
- Jesse Mallet - Vocals
- Noah Raskin - Drums, Vocals

=== Former members ===
- John Thomas - Drums

== Discography ==
- 2006: Are You Ready for a War? (Promo)
- 2007: Intervention
