= Fine (brandy) =

Type of brandy

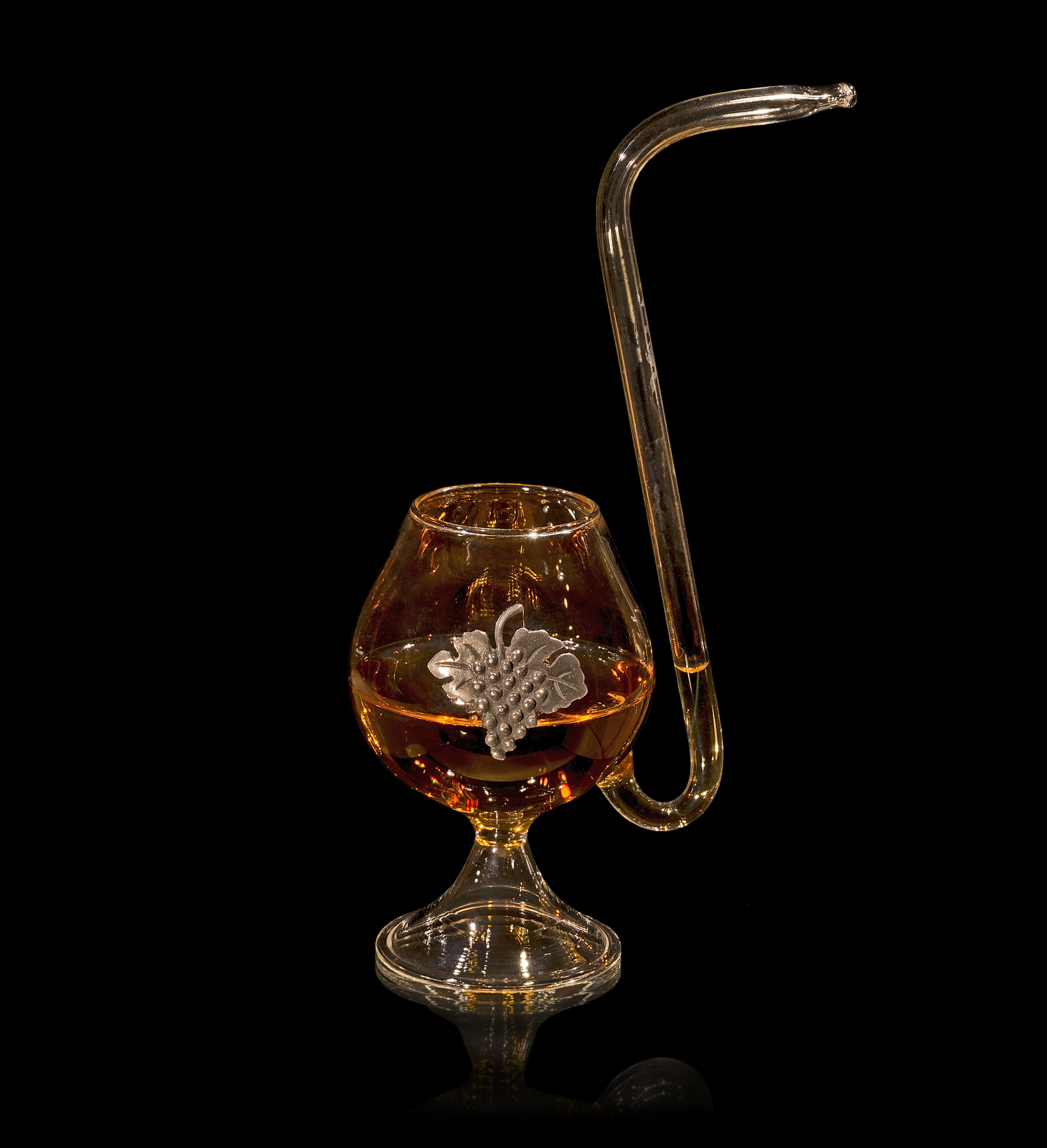
A glass pipe for tasting Cognac or Armagnac (Fine brandy)

In the field of oenology, the French term fine identifies and refers to a brandy that is distilled from wine, as opposed to marc, which is a brandy that is distilled from pomace, the solid remains of grapes after pressing for juice.

In France, fine production often falls under Appellation d'Origine Contrôlée (AOC) designation, with production methods and naming required to meet certain legal requirements. For example:

- Cognac
- Armagnac
- Fine Bordeaux
- Fine de Bourgogne
- Fine du Bugey
- Fine Figures

== In popular culture ==
In the works of Ernest Hemingway, the characters speak of their gastronomic adventures in drinking and eating:

In the novel The Sun Also Rises (1926):

- "We had dined at l'Avenue's, and afterward went to the Café de Versailles for coffee. We had several fines after the coffee. . . ."

and:

- "After the coffee and a fine we got the bill, chalked up, the same as ever, on a slate. . . ."

In the spy movie Goldfinger (1964), in an after-dinner scene with the head of the Bank of England and M:

- James Bond is offered a second pouring of what his host, Col. Smithers, describes as a "rather disappointing brandy." Unclear on his host's meaning, M asks Col. Smithers "What's the matter with it?", and Bond replies, "I'd say it's a thirty-year-old fine, indifferently blended . . . with an overdose of bon bois."

Bond's oenological reference, bon bois, is to a potent brandy from a specific Cognac-producing region in the south-west France.
