= Higashi-Fuji Technical Center =

- Interactive map of the Higashi-Fuji Technical Center area

General information
- Location: 35.230167°N 138.895873°E, 1200 Mishuku, Susono, Japan
- Owner: Toyota Motor Corporation

Technical details
- Floor area: 260,000 square meters
- Grounds: 21,000,000 square meters

Higashi-Fuji Technical Center (東富士研究所, Higashi-Fuji Kenkyūjo) is a Toyota research and development facility in Susono, Shizuoka, Japan. The facility was established in November 1966.

Notably, the center contains an advanced driving simulation housed inside a 7 meters (23 feet) diameter dome with an actual car inside. The simulator is used to analyse driver behaviors in order to improve safety. Higashi-Fuji also includes a crash test building.
