= French frigate Fine =

At least two ships of the French Navy have been named Fine:

- French frigate Fine (1744), launched in 1744 and wrecked in 1745
- French frigate Fine (1779), launched in 1779 and wrecked in 1794
