= Ad Fines =

Ad Fines may refer to Ancient Roman settlements at:

- Chew Green near Alwinton in Northumberland, England
- Gornji Hruševec, Croatia
- Kursumlija, Serbia
- Martorell, Catalonia, Spain
- Pfyn, Switzerland
- Topusko, Croatia
