= Jazz Dreams =

Studio album by Fine
- Released: 23 October 2026
- Recorded: 2025–2026
- Genres: Jangle pop; jazz
- Length: 35:24
- Label: Escho
- Producer: Fine Glindvad Jensen

Fine chronology
Rocky Top Ballads (2024)	Jazz Dreams (2026)

Singles from Jazz Dreams
- 1. "I Could" Released: 22 April 2025; 2. "Run" Released: 25 June 2025; 3. "Portal" Released: 3 September 2025; 4. "Moment" Released: 19 November 2025; 5. "Everything in the Shade" Released: 2 September 2026; 6. "Sometimes I Rush" Released: 30 September 2026

Jazz Dreams is the second solo studio album by Danish musician Fine Glindvad Jensen, known professionally as Fine, released on 23 October 2026 through Escho. It follows her debut album, Rocky Top Ballads (2024), and comprises 13 tracks written, recorded, produced and mixed by Fine.

== Background and singles ==
Following the release of Rocky Top Ballads in 2024, Fine spent the following year and a half developing material for Jazz Dreams. Early versions of songs were performed live, while demos and alternate versions were shared through her radio residency on NTS Radio. Several tracks were released as singles ahead of the album, including "I Could", "Run", "Portal", "Moment", and "Sometimes I Rush". Jensen announced the album on 2 September 2026 alongside the release of the single "Everything in the Shade".

== Composition ==
Jazz Dreams was written, recorded, produced and mixed entirely by Jensen. The album was conceived as a collage, drawing on a "dreamlike structure" that combines "different perspectives and musical ideas". Discussing the creative process, Jensen explained that making an album is "not linear", describing how "the bizarre is simply accepted" as the creator succumbs to the logic of dreams, a process she characterized as both "cruel" and "freeing". The album explores themes of "movement and mutability" through a lens of "cinematic grandeur", spanning a range of genres, including "jazz collages, '70s radio-rock excursions, and minimalist folk passages". The album was designed to "unfold like a jazz improvisation", drawing inspiration from Paul's Boutique (1989), Carole King and Scott Walker. The music was described as "plush, cozy even, steeped in paisley folk and jangle pop", while continually reaching for "tortured anachronisms".

== Critical reception ==
Professional ratings
Review scores
Source	Rating
Our Culture Mag	4/5 stars
Paste	A–
Pitchfork	8.7/10

Jazz Dreams received acclaim from music critics. Hattie Lindert of Pitchfork rated the album 8.7 out of 10, arguing that Fine knew her "way around the muse well enough to follow" (with "try saying yes to the maybe" being a mantra from her student days), at times a little too "brainlessly", while finding the "empty space" in between to be "divine". Lindert described the "simplest" approach as a combination of "classic songcraft" and the "guilelessness of an amateur".

In another near-perfect review, Miranda Wollen of Paste likened the album to something Fine might have heard "in a dream" and attempted to "reverse-engineer" from the back of her mind. She concluded that the album offered a place to visit during the "sleeping hours", "colored in sepia" and "fuzzy".

Writing for Our Culture, Konstantinos Pappis noted a "more flexible" shift in Jensen's songwriting, describing the album as a "mercurial portrait of desire" inspired by the "hollow ends of days". He suggested that listeners might be surprised by the album if they allowed themselves to bend its meaning slightly.

== Track listing ==
All tracks are written by Fine Glindvad Jensen.

Jazz Dreams track listing
No.	Title	Length
1.	"The Thing"	2:08
2.	"If You Wanna Come Down"	3:38
3.	"I Could"	2:36
4.	"Goodbye Brain"	2:50
5.	"Get In"	3:32
6.	"Any Minute"	2:21
7.	"Million Years"	2:41
8.	"Sometimes I Rush"	1:30
9.	"Run"	3:36
10.	"Moment"	2:14
11.	"Everything in the Shade"	3:36
12.	"Portal"	2:25
13.	"Much to Say"	2:17
Total length:		35:24

== Personnel ==
Credits adapted from the album's official Bandcamp listing.

- Fine Glindvad Jensen – vocals, songwriting, production, recording, mixing
- Emil Thomsen – mastering

== Charts ==
Chart performance for Jazz Dreams
Chart (2026)	Peak position
UK Album Downloads (Official Charts)	33
