= Fine topology =

In mathematics, fine topology can refer to:

- Fine topology (potential theory)
- The sense opposite to coarse topology, namely:
  - A term in comparison of topologies which specifies the partial order relation of a topological structure to other one(s)
  - Final topology

== See also ==
- Discrete topology, the most fine topology possible on a given set
