= Toyota concept vehicles =

Toyota concept vehicles are concept vehicles from Toyota, and may refer to:

- Toyota concept vehicles (1935–1969)
- Toyota concept vehicles (1970–1979)
- Toyota concept vehicles (1980–1989)
- Toyota concept vehicles (1990–1999)
- Toyota concept vehicles (2000–2009)
- Toyota concept vehicles (2010–2019)
- Toyota concept vehicles (2020–2029)

== See also ==
- List of Toyota vehicles
