= Fyne Times =

British LGBT periodical

- Editor: Jill Rayner
- Categories: Gay and lesbian
- First issue: September 2001
- Country: United Kingdom
- Language: English
- Website: fyne.co.uk

Fyne Times is a UK based free gay and lesbian magazine, with five regional editions, that was established in September 2001. Edited by Jill Rayner, it is based in Abingdon, near Oxford and is produced by Fyne Associates.

Fyne Times is a lifestyle magazine which strives to have no gender bias or adult content and is found in outlets such as libraries, colleges, youth clubs, hotels and other mainstream venues.

The magazine is also the host of the Gay Greats series written by Natalie Thorne, which has been running since 2002. Fyne Times was also the first gay publication to carry recruitment advertising from one of the armed forces when an advert for the Army appeared in February 2002, soon after the ending of the ban on LGBTs serving in the armed forces.

In February 2004, the magazine welcomed the creation of Welsh lovespoons for gay and lesbian lovers celebrating Valentine's Day.

During 2003-04 the Crown Prosecution Service of Dorset, because of concerns over the reluctance of victims to report homophobic crime, published several articles in the Fyne Times.
