= Fynes =

Fynes is a given name. Notable people with the name include:

- Fynes Moryson (or Morison) (1566–1630), travelled in the 1590s on the European continent and the eastern Mediterranean lands
- Henry Fynes Clinton (1781–1852), English classical scholar and chronologist, born in Gamston, Nottinghamshire
- Savatheda Fynes (born 1974), track and field sprint athlete, competing internationally for Bahamas

== See also ==
- Fiennes
- Fyne (disambiguation)
