= HCNG dispenser =

Type of fuel dispenser

An HCNG dispenser is a type of fuel dispenser that is used to pump hydrogen compressed natural gas (HCNG) into vehicles.

== Principle ==
An HCNG dispenser is generally combined with a CNG dispenser for natural gas vehicles. Both use the same feed stream from the compressed natural gas grid. The hydrogen production method differs per installation. Some use on-site generation while others use delivered hydrogen. The dispensed blend is 30% H_{2} by volume with CNG at 250 bar non-communication fill as HCNG.

== Locations ==
HCNG dispensers can be found at Hynor (Norway) Thousand palms and Barstow California Fort Collins Colorado, Dunkerque, Grenoble and Toulouse (France) Gothenburg Sweden, Dwarka and Faridabad (Delhi), India and the BC hydrogen highway in Canada.

== See also ==
- Hydrogen compressor
- Hydrogen infrastructure
- Hydrogen station
- Hydrogen economy
