= Sylvanus Bowser =

American inventor

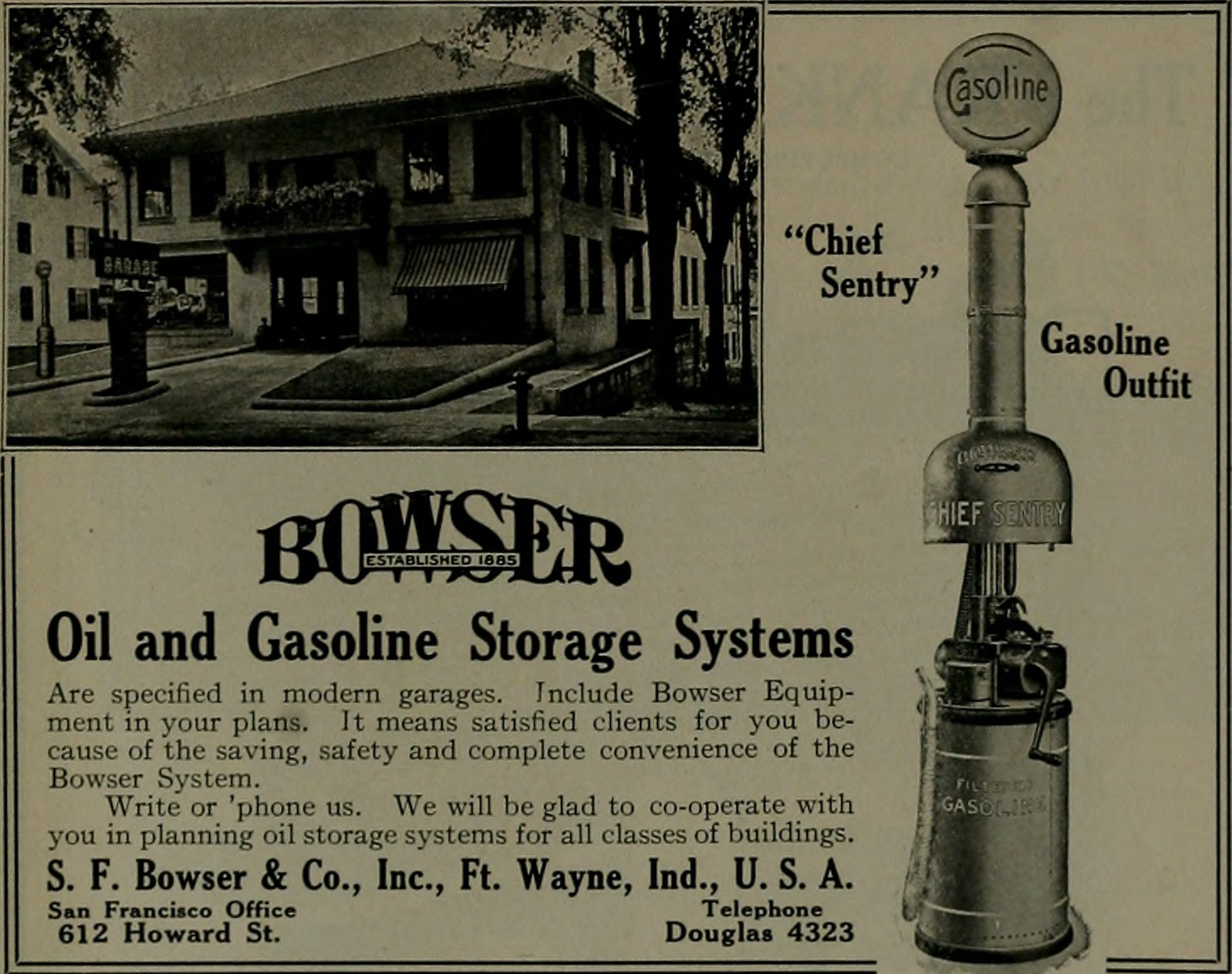
1917 advertisement of S. F. Bowser & Co.

Sylvanus Freelove Bowser (August 8, 1854 – October 3, 1938) was an American inventor who is widely credited with inventing the automobile fuel pump. Bowser Avenue in his hometown of Fort Wayne, Indiana is named after him.

Bowser marketed his patented kerosene pump starting in 1885. The introduction of automobiles, mainly powered by gasoline, led him to develop it into the "Self-Measuring Gasoline Storage Pump", launched in 1905.

Bowser's invention operated with a manual suction pump, which dispensed the gasoline into the car through a flexible hose. The 50 US gallons (190 L; 40 imp gal) metal storage tank, housed in a wooden cabinet, could be set up at the curbside in front of a store.

Under the banner of his company, S. F. Bowser & Company, this activity expanded to the measurement and handling of many commercial liquids. Bowser opened branches around the world, and bowser became a generic term for fuel dispensers, then fuel tankers (especially on airfields), then finally for any kind of self-propelled liquid tanker with the ability to dispense direct to consumers.

In New Zealand and Australia, Bowser is still a generic term for consumer fuel pumps. In the United Kingdom, the term refers to wheeled water tankers (either automotive or towed) used to supply fresh water to areas where normal supplies have been interrupted.

The Bowser company was acquired in 1960 by Keene Corporation in Greeneville, Tennessee. The vacuum oil purification side of the business was divested by Keene in 1978, subsequently trading under the name Enervac. Keene filed for bankruptcy in 1993 due to a large number of asbestos-related lawsuits.
