= Bowser (tanker) =

Type of trailer truck

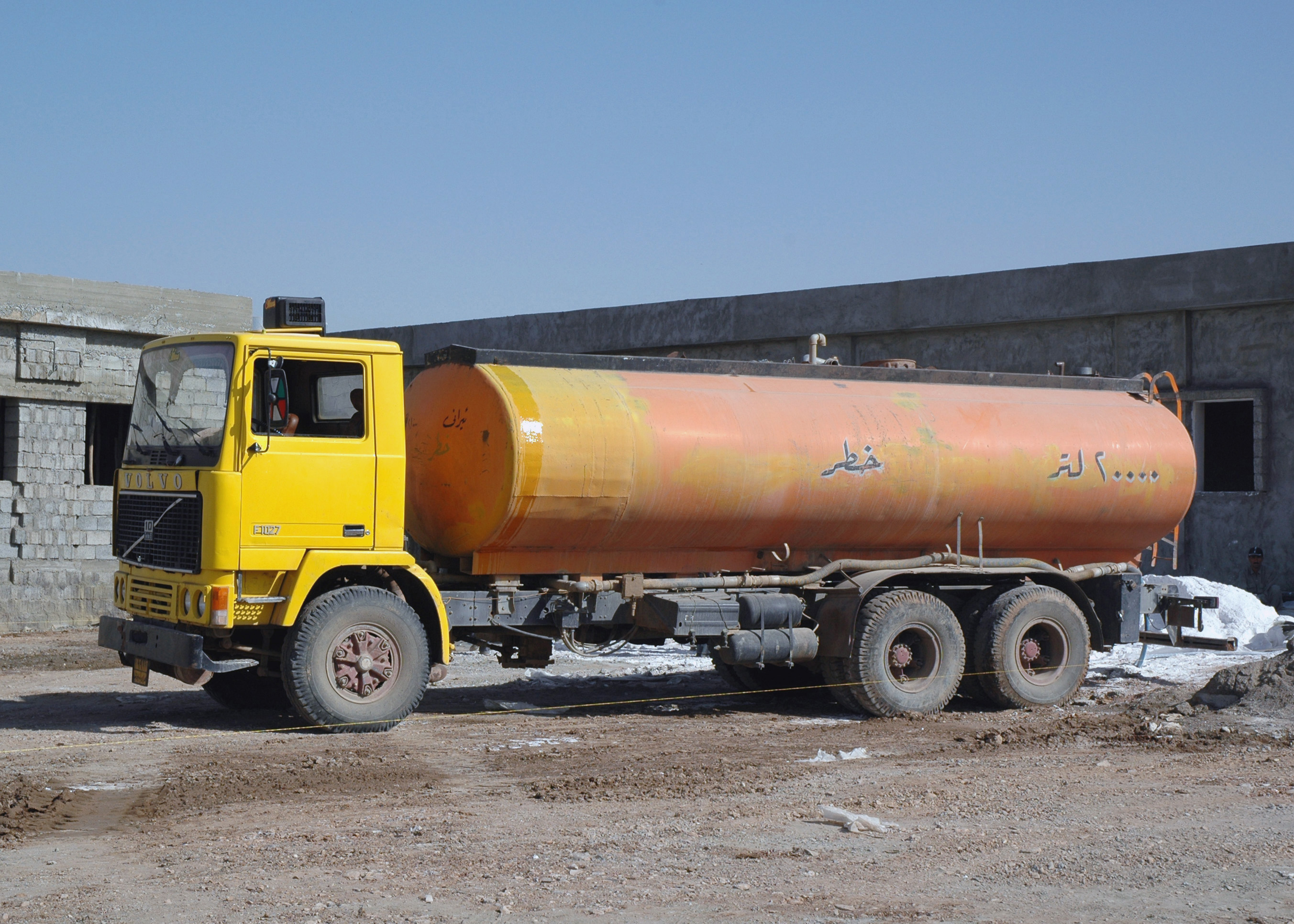
Water tank truck in Iraq

A bowser is a tanker of various kinds, named after Sylvanus Bowser who is credited with inventing the automobile fuel pump.

== Water ==
The term bowser is used by water companies in the United Kingdom to refer to mobile water tanks deployed to distribute fresh water in emergencies where the normal system of piped distribution has broken down or is insufficient.

== Fuel ==
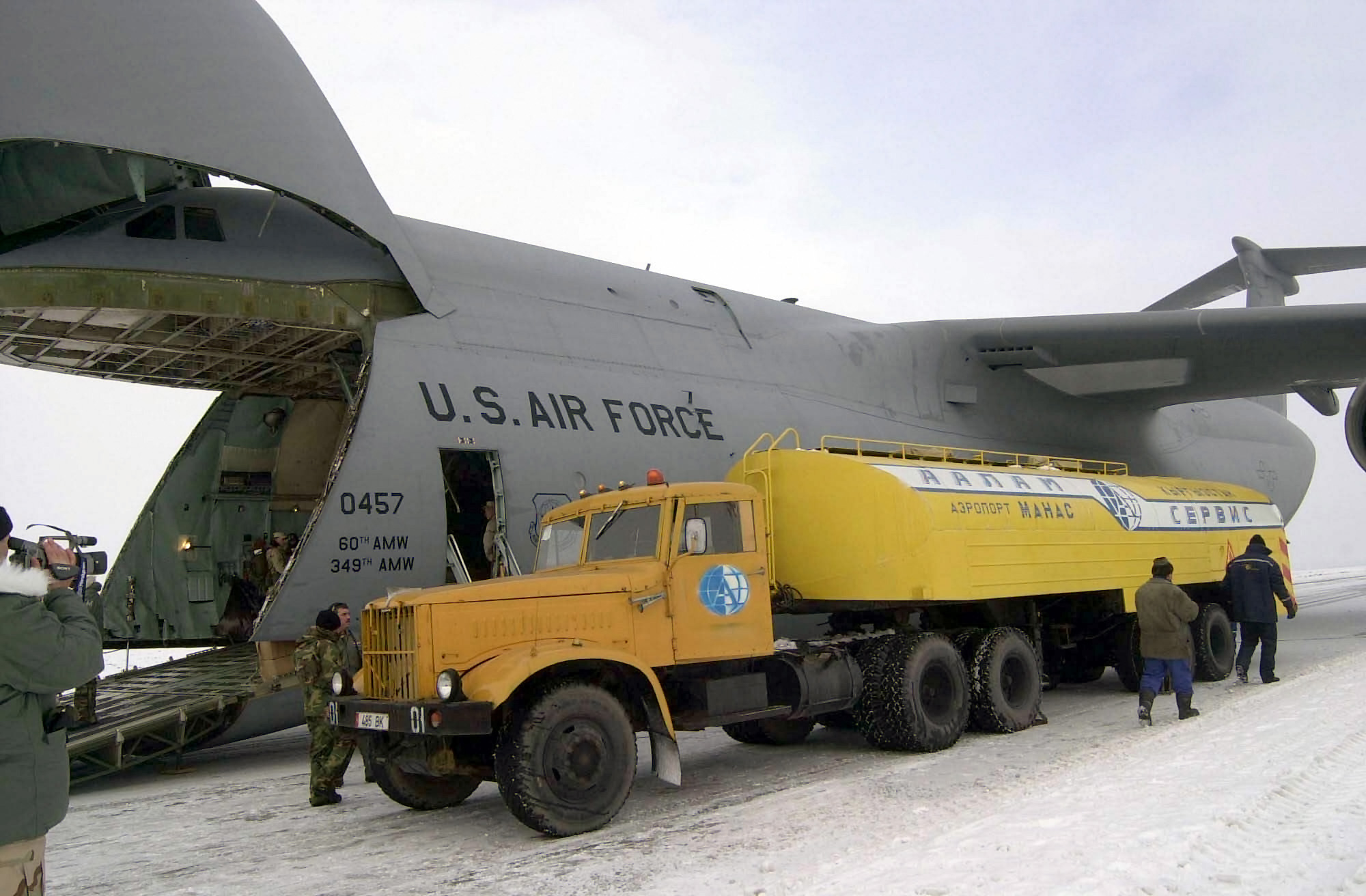
A C-5 Galaxy cargo plane is re-fuelled by a KrAZ-258/TZ-22 tanker at Manas International Airport

Bowser also describes a fuel tanker used to deliver fuel to aircraft at airports or airfields. The term also describes refuelling boats that supply seaplanes, army fuel tankers used for combat resupply, and vehicles that fill heavy construction equipment such as hydraulic excavators and bulldozers. Even aircraft have been described as "flying fuel bowsers" when configured to ferry fuel to support a forward operation.

The related verb, "bowsing," is used in the fuel distribution industry to refer to the practice that allows customers of one fuel distributor to collect fuel from the depot (including retail stations) of a second fuel distributor at the prices set by the first distributor. As such, it is a method of mutual distribution that improves fuel access for customers while reducing the primary costs for each distributor. Being a commercial service, it normally applies to DERV (Diesel Engined Road Vehicle) rather than petrol (gasoline), but can also include new energy solutions, for example, a hydrogen bowser which can be used to refuel gaseous hydrogen to mobile plant and machinery.

== Other fluids ==
At the former nuclear research facility at Dounreay in the far north of Scotland, the word bowser is used to describe various moveable (but not wheeled) vessels that contain alkali metals (sodium or NaK), protected from oxidation by an inert gas. The word may also have been in use at the Atomic Energy Authority's (now UKAEA's) southern sites.
