= BC hydrogen highway =

Planned Canadian fueling project

The BC Hydrogen Highway was a planned hydrogen highway that was supposed to link Vancouver and Whistler with seven hydrogen fueling stations. On March 13, 2007, Canadian Prime Minister Stephen Harper announced funding of almost $200 million Canadian for environmental projects in B.C. including the hydrogen highway. Five stations were built, one each in Whistler, at the University of British Columbia, in Burnaby, and two that were later moved to Surrey. But aside from Whistler they are little-used. Reportedly, only three leased Ford fuel cell cars remain in Surrey. There was a fleet of 20 New Flyer Industries H40LFR conventional buses. However, these buses were pulled out of service in 2014-2015, and were rumoured to be converted to diesel-electric hybrids. However, this has not happened, and as of 2022, the deposition of these buses are unknown. There are no official plans to build any more fuelling stations (although there are four hydrogen stations in Metro Vancouver and one in Victoria as of 2021) as the Hydrogen Highway project closed in 2011.

== See also ==
- HCNG
- Hydrogen infrastructure
- Hydrogen economy
