= Fast fuel system =

A fast fuel system (FFS) allows speedy and safe refueling. FFS are available for applications including mining, heavy construction, buses and railroad. Most larger earthmoving and mining vehicles with diesel fuel tanks over 150 US gallons (570 L) are equipped with FFS. They use an automatic shut-off nozzle, receiver and level control device. FFS operate by connecting a nozzle to the vehicle's fuel tank and a source-mounted pump that delivers fuel into the tank at rates up to 150 US gallons (570 L) per minute.

FFS allows ground level fueling and automatic shut-off upon a full tank. Ground level fueling increases operator safety, by eliminating the need to climb onto vehicles since the fill point is easily accessed from the ground

== Types ==
=== Pressurized ===
Pressurized systems were developed in the 1950s and installed on most large vehicles.

Pressurized FFS operate via sealing the fuel tank at the fill point thus creating internal pressure. The nozzle shuts off when pressure in the fuel system reaches 9 psi (62 kPa). Due to the pressure, most tanks require additional structure to prevent bursting or damaged weld joints. Bursting is both a safety and environmental hazard.

=== Pressureless ===
Caterpillar introduced a pressureless FFS in 1998 for the Caterpillar D11 track type tractor. This was safer for the operator, and reduced ground contamination. Since 1998 many other manufacturers have developed pressureless FFS.

Pressureless FFS operate via a closed loop containing pressure within interior signal lines, level controllers, and a shut-off valve. When the fuel reaches the predetermined fill point inside the tank, a valve closes and pressure builds within the interior signal line. Once the pressure within that signal line reaches a predetermined shut off pressure, the fueling nozzle immediately shuts off, preventing overfilling and spilling. Non-pressurized refueling systems do not require tank pressurization for automatic nozzle shut-off, thus allowing their use on thin-walled metallic and composite fuel tanks.

Pressureless FFS reduce fuel spills and provide more accurate filling. They reduce operator slip, trip and falls; and the risk of injury due to overfill splash. The system also prevents manual override of the fueling system. Pressureless FFS are available from OEMs or authorized OEM Distributors. Most equipment that did not originally have a pressureless FFS can be retrofitted by suppliers such as Fast Fill Systems International, Shaw Development, and Banlaw.

European directive 97/23/EC permits pressureless FFS use in the European Union at tank pressurization less than 7.3 psi (0.5 bar).

Installation procedures are documented in Fast Fill Systems Fueling Installation for Off-Road Self-Propelled Work Machines SAE J176.

Safety is paramount and discussed in more detail in The Diesel Safety Bulletin.

== Gallery ==
Non-pressurized Shaw Development fast fill system installed on a plastic fuel tank
