= HCNG =

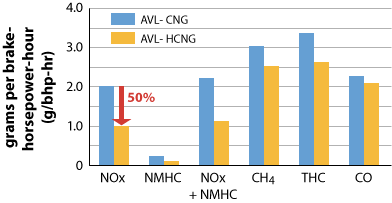
HCNG -CNG emission

HCNG or H2CNG (hydrogen compressed natural gas) is a mixture of compressed natural gas and 4–9 percent hydrogen by energy. It may be used as a fuel gas for internal combustion engines and home appliances.

(regarding the acronyms in the above emissions chart:

AVL = Average Levels?
CNG = Compressed Natural Gas
HCNG = Hydrogen and CNG blend
NO_{X} = Nitrogen Oxides
NMHC = Non-Methane Hydrocarbons?
CH_{4} = Methane
THC = Total Hydrocarbons?
CO = Carbon Monoxide)

HCNG dispensers can be found at Hynor (Norway) Thousand palms and Barstow, California, Fort Collins, Colorado (all US), Chongqing and Shanxi (China), Pico Truncado (Argentina), Islamabad (Pakistan), Dunkerque (France), Gothenburg Sweden, Rio de Janeiro (Brazil), Emilia-Romagna, Lombardia (Italy), Dwarka and Faridabad (Delhi), India and the BC hydrogen highway in Canada.

HCNG for mobile use is premixed at the hydrogen station.

== Research ==
In the town of Nes on the island of Ameland in the Netherlands, a four-year (2008-2011) field test was carried out where 20% hydrogen was added to the local distribution net supplying a complex of 14 apartments. The appliances involved were kitchen stoves, condensing boilers, and micro-CHP boilers.

The use of existing natural gas pipelines for HCNG was studied by NaturalHy.

To get the most out of an internal combustion engine in transportation if higher levels of hydrogen are added, modifications have to be made to the engine and the control strategy. The hydrogen in the blend leads to lower CO_{2} emissions.

== Codes and standards ==
The National Fire Protection Association 52 presently covers CNG and hydrogen fueling stations. Blends with < 20% hydrogen by volume are treated identically to CNG. For the use of blends with more than 30-40 % of hydrogen in volume decision support tools for the design are used to ensure safe use.

== See also ==
- HCNG dispenser
- Hydrogen infrastructure
- Hydrogen economy
