= Chemical looping reforming and gasification =

Chemical looping reforming (CLR) and gasification (CLG) are the operations that involve the use of gaseous carbonaceous feedstock and solid carbonaceous feedstock, respectively, in their conversion to syngas in the chemical looping scheme. The typical gaseous carbonaceous feedstocks used are natural gas and reducing tail gas, while the typical solid carbonaceous feedstocks used are coal and biomass. The feedstocks are partially oxidized to generate syngas using metal oxide oxygen carriers as the oxidant. The reduced metal oxide is then oxidized in the regeneration step using air. The syngas is an important intermediate for generation of such diverse products as electricity, chemicals, hydrogen, and liquid fuels.

The motivation for developing the CLR and CLG processes lies in their advantages of being able to avoid the use of pure oxygen in the reaction, thereby circumventing the energy intensive air separation requirement in the conventional reforming and gasification processes. The energy conversion efficiency of the processes can, thus, be significantly increased. Steam and carbon dioxide can also be used as the oxidants. As the metal oxide also serves as the heat transfer medium in the chemical looping process, the exergy efficiency of the reforming and gasification processes like that for the combustion process is also higher as compared to the conventional processes.

== Description ==
The CLR and CLG processes use solid metal oxides as the oxygen carrier instead of pure oxygen as the oxidant. In one reactor, termed the reducer or fuel reactor, the carbonaceous feedstock is partially oxidized to syngas, while the metal oxide is reduced to a lower oxidation state as given by:

CH_{a}O_{b} + (1−b)/δ MeO_{x} → CO + a/2 H_{2} + (1−b)/δ MeO_{x−δ}

where Me is a metal. It is noted that the reaction in the reducer of the CLR and CLG processes differs from that in the chemical looping combustion (CLC) process in that, the feedstock in CLC process is fully oxidized to CO_{2} and H_{2}O. In another reactor, termed the oxidizer, combustor or air reactor (when air is used as the regeneration agent), the reduced metal oxide from the reducer is re-oxidized by air or steam as given by:

2/δ MeO_{x−δ} + O_{2} (air) → 2/δ MeO_{x} + (O_{2} depleted air)
1/δ MeO_{x−δ} + H_{2}O → 1/δ MeO_{x} + H_{2}

The solid metal oxide oxygen carrier is then circulated between these two reactors. That is the reducer and the oxidizer/combustor are connected in a solids circulatory loop, while the gaseous reactants and products from each of the two reactors are isolated by the gas seals between the reactors. This streamlining configuration of the chemical looping system possesses a process intensification property with a smaller process footprint as compared to that for the traditional systems.

== Oxygen carriers ==
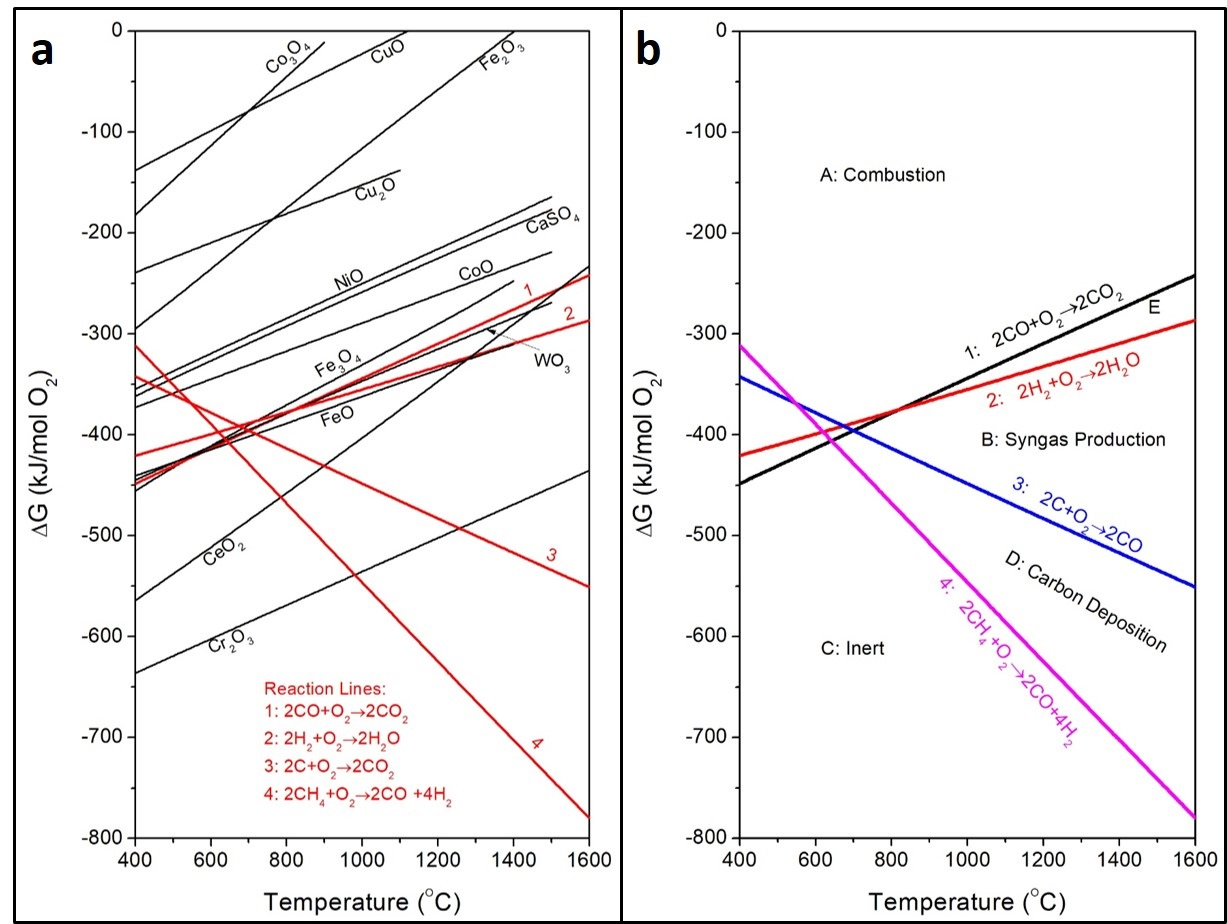
Fig 1. Modified Ellingham diagram:(a) to determine metal oxide performance in chemical looping processes; (b) with sections indicated for chemical looping applications.

The Ellingham diagram that provides the Gibbs free energy formation of a variety of metal oxides is widely used in metallurgical processing for determining the relative reduction-oxidation potentials of metal oxides at different temperatures. It depicts the thermodynamic property of a variety of metal oxides to be used as potential oxygen carrier materials. It can be modified to provide the Gibbs free energy changes for metals and metal oxides under various oxidation states so that it can be directly used for the selection of metal oxide oxygen carrier materials based on their oxidation capabilities for specific chemical looping applications. The modified Ellingham diagram is given in Fig 1a. As shown in Fig 1b, the diagram can be divided into four different sections based on the following four key reactions:

Reaction line 1: 2CO + O_{2} → 2CO_{2}
Reaction line 2: 2H_{2} + O_{2} → 2H_{2}O
Reaction line 3: 2C + O_{2} → 2CO
Reaction line 4: 2CH_{4} + O_{2} → 2CO + 4H_{2}

The sections identified in Fig 1b provide the information on metal oxide materials that can be selected as potential oxygen carriers for desired chemical looping applications. Specifically, highly oxidative metal oxides, such as NiO, CoO, CuO, Fe_{2}O_{3} and Fe_{3}O_{4} belong to the combustion section (Section A) and they all lie above the reaction lines 1 and 2. These metal oxides have a high oxidizing tendency and can be used as oxygen carriers for the chemical looping combustion, gasification or partial oxidation processes. The metal oxides in Section E, the small section between the reaction lines 1 and 2, can be used for CLR and CLG, although a significant amount of H_{2}O may present in the syngas product. The section for syngas production lies between reaction lines 2 and 3 (Section B). Metal oxides lying in this region, such as CeO_{2}, have moderate oxidation tendencies and are suitable for CLR and CLG but not for the complete oxidation reactions. Metal oxides below reaction line 3 (Sections C and D) are not thermodynamically favored for oxidizing the fuels to syngas. Thus, they cannot be used as oxygen carriers and are generally considered to be inert. These materials include Cr_{2}O_{3} and SiO_{2}. They can, however, be used as support materials along with active oxygen carrier materials. In addition to the relative redox potentials of metal oxide materials illustrated in Fig 1b, the development of desired oxygen carriers for chemical looping applications requires to consider such properties as oxygen carrying capacity, redox reactivity, reaction kinetics, recyclability, attrition resistance, heat carrying capacity, melting point, and production cost.

== Process configurations ==
The CLR and CLG processes can be configured based on the types of carbonaceous feedstocks given and desired products to be produced. Among a broad range of products, the CLG process can produce electricity through chemical looping IGCC. The syngas produced from the CLR and the CLG can be used to synthesize a variety of chemicals, liquid fuels and hydrogen. Given below are some specific examples of the CLR and CLG processes.

=== Steam methane reforming with chemical looping combustion (CLC-SMR) ===
Fig 2. CLC-SMR system for H_{2} production: (a) SMR reactor inside the reducer (fuel reactor) (b) SMR reactor inside the combustor (air reactor)

Hydrogen and syngas are currently produced largely by steam methane reforming (SMR). The main reaction in SMR is:

CH_{4} + H_{2}O → CO + 3H_{2}

Steam can be further used to convert CO to H_{2} via the water-gas shift reaction (WGS):

H_{2}O + CO → CO_{2} + H_{2}

The SMR reaction is endothermic, which requires heat input. The state-of-art SMR system places the tubular catalytic reactors in a furnace, in which fuel gas is burned to provide the required heat.

In the SMR with chemical looping combustion (CLC-SMR) concepts shown in Fig 2, the syngas production is carried out by the SMR in a tubular catalytic reactor while the chemical looping combustion system is used to provide the heat for the catalytic reaction. Depending on which chemical looping reactor is used to provide the SMR reaction heat, two CLC-SMR schemes can be configured. In Scheme 1 (Fig 2a), the reaction heat is provided by the reducer (fuel reactor). In Scheme 2 (Fig 2b), the reaction heat is provided by the combustor (air reactor). In either scheme, the combustion of metal oxide by air in the chemical looping system provides the heat source that sustains the endothermic SMR reactions. In the chemical looping system, natural gas and the recycled off-gas from the pressure swing adsorption (PSA) of the SMR process system are used as the feedstock for the CLC fuel reactor operation with CO_{2} and the steam as the reaction products. The CLC-SMR concepts have mainly been studied from the perspective of the process simulation. It is seen that both schemes do not engage directly the chemical looping system as a means for syngas production.

CLC-SMR can provide higher energy efficiency than conventional SMR, because furnace temperature can be significantly reduced. Consequently, a negative CO_{2} capture cost could be possible. To avoid risk of erosion of the reformer tubes, these can be placed in fluidized-bed heat exchangers (FBHEs) connected to the air reactor. Lower temperature and more efficient heat transfer in FBHEs may also allow for thinner and shorter reformer tubes and reduce need for catalyst.

=== Chemical looping reforming (CLR) ===
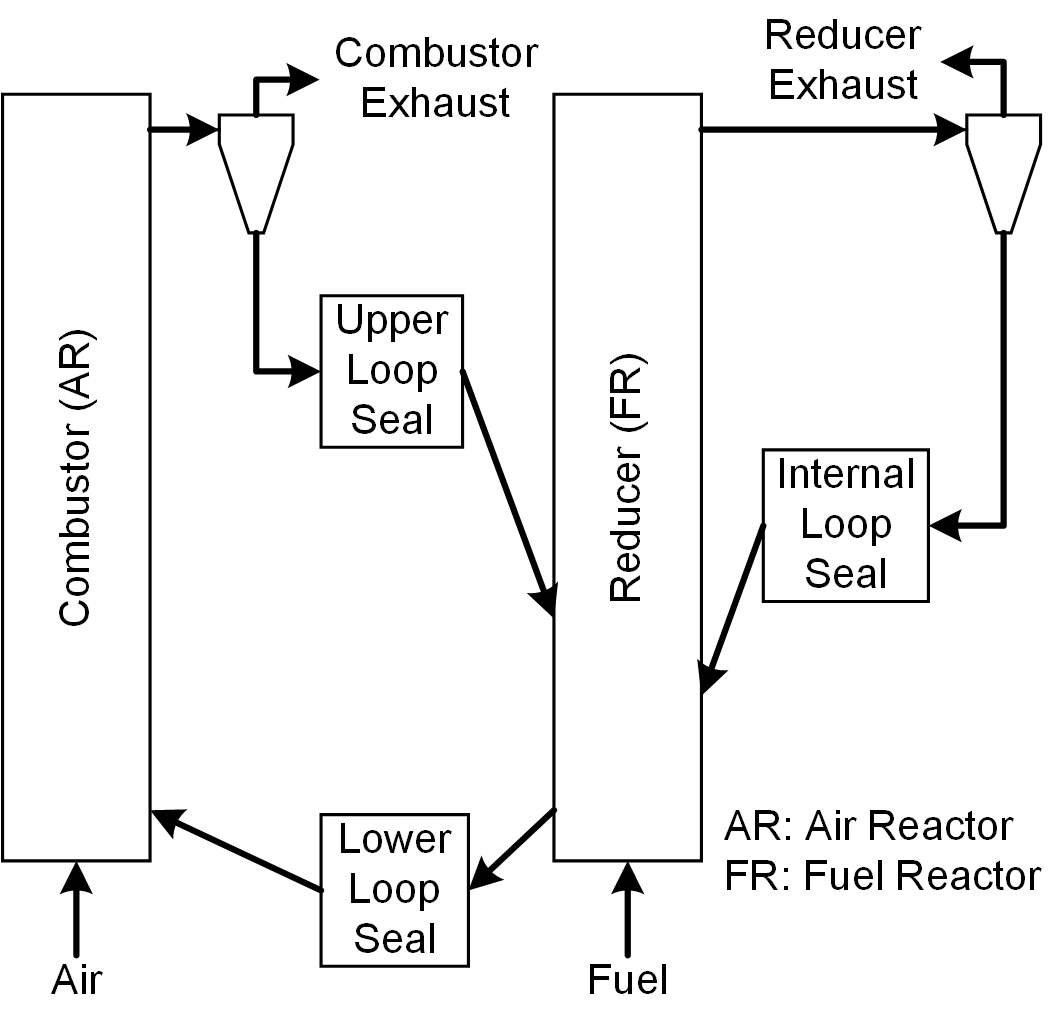
Fig 3. CLR using a circulating fluidized bed configuration

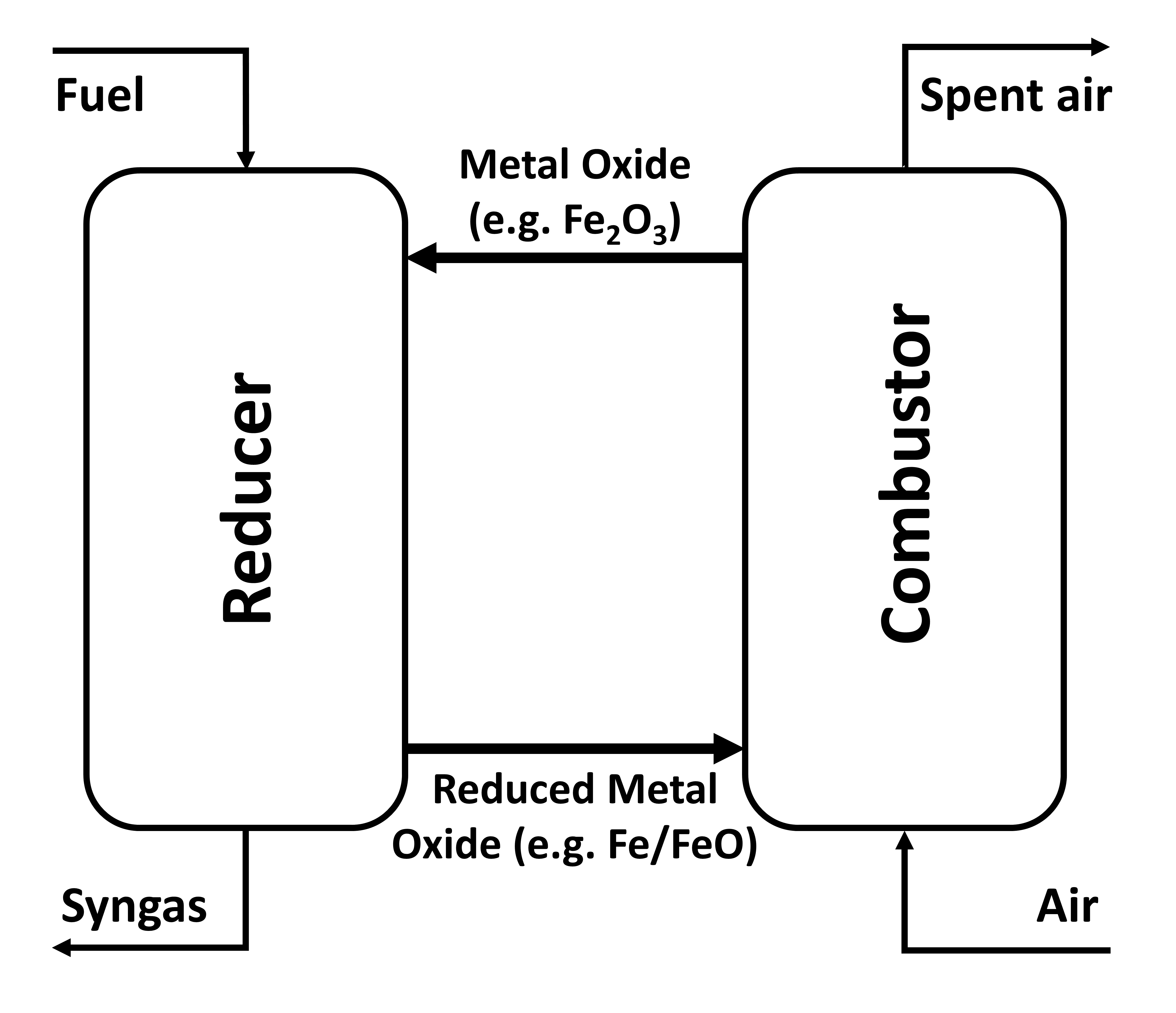
Fig 4. CLR system with a moving bed reducer

Chemical looping systems can directly be engaged as an effective means for syngas production. Compared to the conventional partial oxidation (POX) or autothermal reforming (ATR) processes, the key advantage of the chemical looping reforming (CLR) process is the elimination of the air separation unit (ASU) for oxygen production. The gaseous fuel, typically natural gas, is fed to the fuel reactor, in which a solid metal oxide oxygen carrier partially oxidizes the fuel to generate syngas:

CH_{4} + 1/δ MeO_{x} → CO + 2H_{2} + 1/δ MeO_{x−δ}

Steam can be added to the reaction in order to increase the generation of H_{2}, via the water-gas shift reaction (WGS) and/or steam methane reforming.

The CLR process can produce a syngas with a H_{2}:CO molar ratio of 2:1 or higher, which is suitable for Fischer–Tropsch synthesis, methanol synthesis, or hydrogen production. The reduced oxygen carrier from the reducer is oxidized by air in the combustor:

2/δ MeO_{x-δ} + O_{2} (air) → 2/δ MeO_{x}

The overall reaction in the CLR system is a combination of the partial oxidation reaction of the fuel and the WGS reaction:

CH_{4} + (1−a)/2 O_{2} + a H_{2}O → CO + (2+a) H_{2}

It is noted that the actual reaction products for such reactions as those given above can vary depending on the actual operating conditions. For example, the CLR reactions can also produce CO_{2} when highly oxidative oxygen carriers such as NiO and Fe_{2}O_{3} are used. The carbon deposition occurs particularly when the oxygen carrier is highly reduced. Reduced oxygen carrier species, such as Ni and Fe, catalyze the hydrocarbon pyrolysis reactions.

Fig 3 shows a CLR system that has been studied experimentally by Vienna University of Technology. The system consists of a fluidized bed reducer and a fluidized bed combustor, connected by loop seals and cyclones. Commonly used oxygen carriers are based on NiO or Fe_{2}O_{3}. The NiO-based oxygen carriers exhibit excellent reactivity, as shown by the high conversion of natural gas. The Fe_{2}O_{3}-based oxygen carriers have a lower material cost while their reactivity is lower than that of the NiO-based ones. Operating variables such as temperature, pressure, type of metal oxide, and molar ratio of metal oxide to gaseous fuel will influence the fuel conversion and product compositions. However, with the effects of the back mixing and distributed residence time for the metal oxide particles in the fluidized bed, the oxidation state of the metal oxide particles in the fluidized bed varies that prevents a high purity of the syngas to be produced from the reactor.

The moving bed reactor that does not have the effects of back mixing of the metal oxide particles is another gas-solid contact configuration for CLR/CLG operation. This reactor system developed by Ohio State University is characterized by a co-current gas-solid moving bed reducer as given in Fig 4. The moving bed reducer can maintain the uniform oxidation state of the exit metal oxide particles from the reactor. thereby synchronizing the process operation to achieve the thermodynamic equilibrium conditions. The CLR moving bed process applied to the methane to syngas (MTS) reactions has the flexibility of co-feeding CO_{2} as a feedstock with such gaseous fuels as natural gas, shale gas, and reducing tail gases, yielding a CO_{2} negative process system. The CLR-MTS system can yield a higher energy efficiency and cost benefits over the conventional syngas technologies. In a benchmark study for production of 50,000 barrels per day of liquid fuels using the natural gas as the feedstock, the CLR - MTS system for syngas production can reduce the natural gas usage by 20% over the conventional systems involving the Fischer–Tropsch technology.

=== Chemical looping gasification (CLG) ===
Chemical looping gasification (CLG) differs from the CLR in that it uses solid fuels such as coal and biomass instead of gaseous fuels as feedstocks. The operating principles for the CLG is similar to CLR. For solid feedstocks, devolatilization and pyrolysis of the solid fuel occur when the solid fuels are introduced into the reducer and mixed with the oxygen carrier particles. With the fluidized bed reducer, the released volatiles, including light organic compounds and tars, may channel through the reducer and exit with the syngas. The light organic compounds may reduce the purity of the syngas, while the tars may accumulate in downstream pipelines and instruments. For example, the carbon efficiency using the coal CLG fluidized bed reducer may vary from 55% to 81%, whereas the carbon efficiency using the coal moving bed reducer can reach 85% to 98%. The syngas derived from the biomass CLG fluidized bed reducer may consist of up to 15% methane, while the syngas derived from the biomass CLG moving bed reducer can reach a methane concentration of less than 5%. In general, increasing the temperature of the CLG system can promote volatile and char conversion. This may also promote the full oxidation side reaction resulting in an increased CO_{2} concentration in the syngas. Additional equipment for gas cleanup including scrubber, catalytic steam reformer and/or tar reformer may be necessary downstream of the CLG system in order to remove or convert the unwanted byproducts in the syngas stream. Char, the remaining solid from the devolatilization and reactions, requires additional time for conversion. For a fluidized bed reducer with particle back mixing, unconverted char may leave the reducer with the reduced metal oxide particles. A carbon stripper may be needed at the solid outlet of the fluidized bed reducer to allow the unconverted char to be separated from the oxygen carriers. The char can be recycled back to the reducer for further conversion.

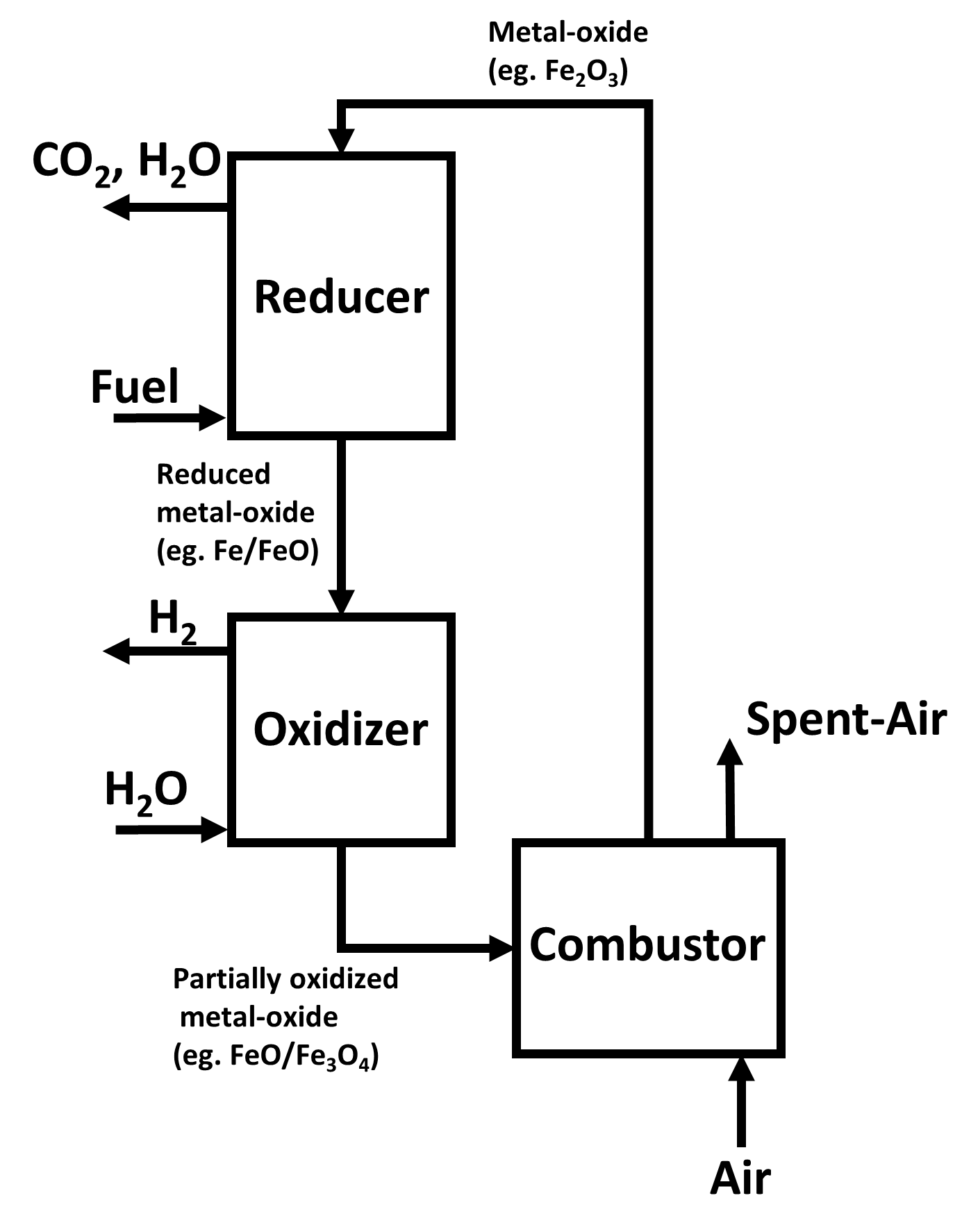
Fig 5. Chemical looping three-reactor system for hydrogen production

In a similar operating scheme to the CLR - MTS system given in Fig 4, chemical looping gasification (CLG) of solid fuels carried out in a co-current moving bed reducer to partially oxidize solid fuels into syngas can reach an appropriate H_{2}/CO ratio for downstream processing. Coal ash is removed through in-situ gas-solid separation operation. The moving bed prevents the channeling or bypassing of the volatiles and chars, thereby maximizing the conversion of the solid fuel. The full oxidation side reactions can be impeded through the control of the oxidation state formed for the oxygen carriers in the moving bed reactor. The CLR moving bed process applied to the coal to syngas (CTS) reactions also has the flexibility of co-feeding CO_{2} as a feedstock with coal yielding a CO_{2} negative process system with a high purity of syngas production. In a benchmark study for production of 10,000 ton/day of methanol from coal, the upstream gasification capital cost can be reduced by 50% when the chemical looping moving bed gasification system is used.

== Broader context ==
In a general sense, the CLR and CLG processes for syngas production are part of the chemical looping partial oxidation or selective oxidation reaction schemes. The syngas production can lead to the hydrogen production from the downstream water-gas shift reaction. The CLG process can also be applied to electricity generation, resembling the IGCC based on the syngas generated from the chemical looping processes. The chemical looping three-reactor (including reducer, oxidizer and combustor) system using a moving bed reducer for metal oxide reduction by fuel followed by a moving bed oxidizer for the water splitting to produce hydrogen is given in Fig 5. For coal-based feedstock applications, this system is estimated to reduce the cost for electricity generation by 5-15% as compared to conventional systems.

The selective oxidation based chemical looping processes can be used to produce directly in one step value-added products beyond syngas. These chemical looping processes require the use of designed metal oxide oxygen carrier that has a high product selectivity and a high feedstock conversion. An example is the chemical looping selective oxidation process developed by DuPont for producing maleic anhydride from butane. The oxygen carrier used in this process is vanadium phosphorus oxide (VPO) based material. This chemical looping process was advanced to the commercial level. Its commercial operation, however, was hampered in part by the inadequacies in the chemical and mechanical viability of the oxygen carrier VPO and its associated effects on the reaction kinetics of the particles.

Chemical looping selective oxidation was also applied to the production of olefins from methane. In chemical looping oxidative coupling of methane (OCM), the oxygen carrier selectively converts methane into ethylene.
