= Small stationary reformer =

A small stationary reformer is an on-site device used for the production of hydrogen from hydrocarbons on a small scale.

== Types ==
=== Membrane reactor ===
A membrane reactor is a device where oxygen separation, steam reforming and POX is combined in a single step. In 1997 Argonne National Laboratory and Amoco published a paper "Ceramic membrane reactor for converting methane to syngas" which resulted in different small scale systems that combined an ATR based oxygen membrane with a water-gas shift reactor and a hydrogen membrane.

=== POX reactor ===
Partial oxidation (POX) is a type of chemical reaction. It occurs when a substoichiometric fuel-air mixture is partially combusted in a reformer, creating a hydrogen-rich syngas which can then be put to further use, for example in a fuel cell. A distinction is made between thermal partial oxidation (TPOX) and catalytic partial oxidation (CPOX).

== Research ==
- Microchannel Reformer
- Ion transport membrane reforming.

== Centralized hydrogen production ==
The capital cost of methane reformer plants is prohibitive for small to medium size applications because the technology does not scale down well. Conventional steam reforming plants operate at pressures between 200 and 600 psi with outlet temperatures in the range of 815 to 925 °C. However, analyses have shown that even though it is more costly to construct, a well-designed SMR can produce hydrogen more cost-effectively than an ATR. To lower the costs both pressure and used temperature are lowered which allows for the use of cheaper materials.

== See also ==
- Hydrogen production
