= Liquid nitrogen wash =

Cryogenic nitrogen scrubbing of syngas

Liquid nitrogen wash is a process mainly used for the production of ammonia synthesis gas within fertilizer production plants. It is usually the last purification step in the ammonia production process sequence upstream of the actual ammonia production.

== Competing technologies ==
The purpose of the final purification step upstream of the actual ammonia production is to remove all components that are poisonous for the sensitive ammonia synthesis catalyst. This can be done with the following concepts:

- Methanation, formally the standard concept with the disadvantage, that the methane content is not removed, but even increased, since in this process, the carbon oxides (carbon monoxide and carbon dioxide) are converted to methane.
- Pressure Swing Adsorption, which can replace the low temperature shift, the carbon dioxide removal and the methanation, since this process produces pure hydrogen, which can be mixed with pure nitrogen.
- Liquid Nitrogen Wash, which produces an ammonia syngas for a so-called "inert free" ammonia synthesis loop, that can be operated without the withdrawal of a purge gas stream.

== Functions ==
The liquid nitrogen wash has two principal functions:

- Removal of impurities such as carbon monoxide, argon and methane from the crude hydrogen gas
- Addition of the required stoichiometric amount of nitrogen to the hydrogen stream to achieve the correct ammonia synthesis gas ratio of hydrogen to nitrogen of 3 : 1

The carbon monoxide must be removed completely from the synthesis gas (i.e. syngas) since it is poisonous for the sensitive ammonia synthesis catalyst. The components argon and methane are inert gases within the ammonia synthesis loop, but would enrich there and call for a purge gas system with synthesis gas losses or additional expenditures for a purge gas separation unit. The main sources for the supply of feed gases are partial oxidation processes.

== Upstream syngas preparations ==
Since the synthesis gas exiting the partial oxidation process consists mainly of carbon monoxide and hydrogen, usually a sulfur tolerant CO shift (i.e. water-gas shift reaction) is installed in order to convert as much carbon monoxide into hydrogen as possible.

Shifting carbon monoxide and water into hydrogen also produces carbon dioxide, usually this is removed in an acid gas scrubbing process together with other sour gases as e.g. hydrogen sulfide (e.g. in a Rectisol Wash Unit).

== Components ==
The liquid nitrogen wash consists of

- an adsorber unit where solvent traces of an upstream acid gas scrubbing process (e.g. methanol, water), traces of carbon dioxide or other compounds are completely removed in a molecular sieve bed in order to avoid freezing and subsequently blockage in the low temperature process which operates at temperatures down to 80 K (-193 °C or -315 °F) and
- the actual liquid nitrogen wash enclosed in a so-called cold box where all cryogenic process equipment is located and insulated in order to minimize heat ingress from ambient.

== Principle of operation ==
Nitrogen is supplied from outside of the unit to be used for scrubbing as gaseous high pressure nitrogen, supplied by the Air separation Unit that usually also provides the oxygen for the upstream Partial Oxidation.
This gaseous high pressure nitrogen is partially liquefied in the process and is used as washing agent. In a so-called nitrogen wash column, the impurities carbon monoxide, argon and methane are washed out of the synthesis gas by means of this liquid nitrogen. These impurities are dissolved together with a small part of hydrogen and leave the column as the bottom stream.
The purified gas leaves the column at the top. The now purified synthesis gas is warmed up and is mixed with the required amount of gaseous high pressure nitrogen in order to achieve the hydrogen to nitrogen ratio of 3 to 1, and can then be routed to the ammonia synthesis.
At operating pressures higher than about 50 bar(a), the refrigeration demand of the liquid nitrogen wash is covered by the Joule–Thomson effect, and no additional external refrigeration, e.g. by vaporization of liquid nitrogen is required.

== Advantages in combination with Rectisol process ==
The liquid nitrogen wash is especially favorable when combined with the Rectisol Wash Unit. The combination and advantageous interconnections between a Rectisol Wash Unit and a liquid nitrogen wash lead to smaller equipment and better operability.
The gas coming from the Rectisol Wash Unit can be sent to the Liquid Nitrogen Wash at low temperature (directly from the methanol absorber without being warmed up). Since part of the purified gas is reheated in the Rectisol Wash Unit, small fluctuations in flow and temperatures can easily be compensated leading to best operability.
To improve the hydrogen recovery, an integrated hydrogen recycle from the liquid nitrogen wash to the Rectisol Wash Unit can be installed, which uses the already existing recycle compressor of the Rectisol Wash Unit to recycle the hydrogen-rich flash gas from the liquid nitrogen wash back into the feed gas of the Rectisol Wash Unit. This leads to extremely high hydrogen recovery rates without any further equipment.
