= Methane reformer =

A methane reformer is a device based on steam reforming, autothermal reforming or partial oxidation and is a type of chemical synthesis which can produce pure hydrogen gas from methane using a catalyst. There are multiple types of reformers in development but the most common in industry are autothermal reforming (ATR) and steam methane reforming (SMR). Most methods work by exposing methane to a catalyst (usually nickel) at high temperature and pressure.

== Steam reforming ==
Steam reforming (SR), sometimes referred to as steam methane reforming (SMR) uses an external source of hot gas to heat tubes in which a catalytic reaction takes place that converts steam and lighter hydrocarbons such as methane, biogas or refinery feedstock into hydrogen and carbon monoxide (syngas). Syngas reacts further to give more hydrogen and carbon dioxide in the reactor. The carbon oxides are removed before use by means of pressure swing adsorption (PSA) with molecular sieves for the final purification. The PSA works by adsorbing impurities from the syngas stream to leave a pure hydrogen gas.

CH_{4} + H_{2}O (steam) → CO + 3 H_{2} Endothermic
CO + H_{2}O (steam) → CO_{2} + H_{2} Exothermic

== Autothermal reforming ==
Autothermal reforming (ATR) uses oxygen and carbon dioxide or steam in a reaction with methane to form syngas. The reaction takes place in a single chamber where the methane is partially oxidized. The reaction is exothermic due to the oxidation. When the ATR uses carbon dioxide the H_{2}:CO ratio produced is 1:1; when the ATR uses steam the H_{2}:CO ratio produced is 2.5:1

The reactions can be described in the following equations, using CO_{2}:

2 CH_{4} + O_{2} + CO_{2} → 3 H_{2} + 3 CO + H_{2}O

And using steam:

4 CH_{4} + O_{2} + 2 H_{2}O → 10 H_{2} + 4 CO

The outlet temperature of the syngas is between 950 and 1100 °C and outlet pressure can be as high as 100 bar.

The main difference between SMR and ATR is that SMR only uses oxygen via air for combustion as a heat source to create steam, while ATR directly combusts oxygen. The advantage of ATR is that the H_{2}:CO can be varied, this is particularly useful for producing certain second generation biofuels, such as DME which requires a 1:1 H_{2}:CO ratio.

== Partial oxidation ==
Partial oxidation (POX) is a type of chemical reaction. It occurs when a substoichiometric fuel-air mixture is partially combusted in a reformer, creating a hydrogen-rich syngas which can then be put to further use.

== Advantages and disadvantages ==
The capital cost of steam reforming plants is prohibitive for small to medium size applications because the technology does not scale down well. Conventional steam reforming plants operate at pressures between 200 and 600 psi with outlet temperatures in the range of 815 to 925 °C. However, analyses have shown that even though it is more costly to construct, a well-designed SMR can produce hydrogen more cost-effectively than an ATR for smaller applications.

== See also ==
- Catalytic reforming
- Industrial gas
- Reformed methanol fuel cell
- PROX
- Partial oxidation
- Chemical looping reforming and gasification
