= Ammonia production =

Overview of history and methods to produce NH_{3}

Ammonia production takes place worldwide, mostly in large-scale manufacturing plants that produce 240 million metric tonnes of ammonia (2023) annually. Based on the annual production in 2023 the major part (~70%) of the production facilities are based in China (29%), India (9.5%), USA (9.5%), Russia (9.5%), Indonesia (4%), Iran (2.9%), Egypt (2.7%), and middle Saudi Arabia (2.7%). 80% or more of ammonia is used as fertilizer. Ammonia is also used for the production of plastics, fibres, explosives, nitric acid (via the Ostwald process), and intermediates for dyes and pharmaceuticals. The industry contributes 1% to 2% of global CO_{2}. Between 18–20 Mt of the gas is transported globally each year.

== Haber-Bosch process ==
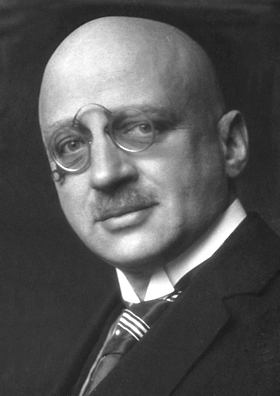
Fritz Haber, 1918

The Haber process, also called the Haber–Bosch process, is the main industrial procedure for the production of ammonia. It converts atmospheric nitrogen (N_{2}) to ammonia (NH_{3}) by a reaction with hydrogen (H_{2}) using finely divided iron metal as a catalyst:

$\ce{N2 + 3H2 <=> 2NH3} \qquad {\Delta H^\circ_\mathrm{298~K} = -92.28~\text{kJ per mole of }\ce{N2}}$

This reaction is exothermic but disfavored in terms of entropy because four equivalents of reactant gases are converted into two equivalents of product gas. However, due to the extremely high kinetic barriers to bond cleavage, high pressures and temperatures are needed to drive the reaction forward. The Haber Process was first created by the German Chemist Fritz Haber, then developed after a few years by Carl Bosch.

The German chemists Fritz Haber and Carl Bosch developed the process in the first decade of the 20th century, and its improved efficiency over existing methods such as the Birkeland–Eyde and Frank–Caro processes was a major advancement in the industrial production of ammonia.

The Haber process can be combined with steam reforming to produce ammonia with just three chemical inputs: water, natural gas, and atmospheric nitrogen. Both Haber and Bosch were eventually awarded the Nobel Prize in Chemistry: Haber in 1918 for ammonia synthesis specifically, and Bosch in 1931 for related contributions to high-pressure chemistry.

== Environmental Impacts ==
Because ammonia production depends on a reliable supply of energy, fossil fuels are often used, contributing to climate change when they are combusted and create greenhouse gasses. Ammonia production also introduces nitrogen into the Earth's nitrogen cycle, causing imbalances that contribute to environmental issues such as algae blooms. Certain production methods prove to have less of an environmental impact, such as those powered by renewable or nuclear energy.

== History ==
=== Dry distillation ===
Before the start of World War I, most ammonia was obtained by the dry distillation of nitrogenous vegetable and animal products; by the reduction of nitrous acid and nitrites with hydrogen; and also by the decomposition of ammonium salts by alkaline hydroxides or by quicklime, the salt most generally used being the chloride (sal-ammoniac).

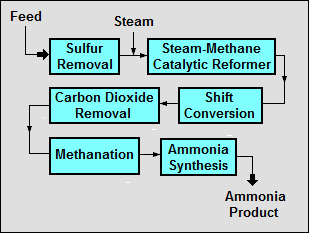
Block flow diagram of the ammonia synthesis process

=== Frank–Caro process ===
Adolph Frank and Nikodem Caro found that Nitrogen could be fixed by using the same calcium carbide produced to make acetylene to form calcium-cyanamide, which could then be divided with water to form ammonia. The method was developed between 1895 and 1899.

$$\ce{CaO + 3C <=> CaC2 + CO}$$
$$\ce{CaC2 + N2 <=> CaCN2 + C}$$
$\ce{CaCN2 + 3H2O <=> CaCO3 + 2NH3}$

=== Birkeland–Eyde process ===
While not strictly speaking a method of producing ammonia, nitrogen can be fixed by passing it (with oxygen) through an electric spark.

=== Nitrides ===
Heating metals such as magnesium in an atmosphere of pure nitrogen produces nitride, which when combined with water produce metal hydroxide and ammonia.

== Sustainable production ==
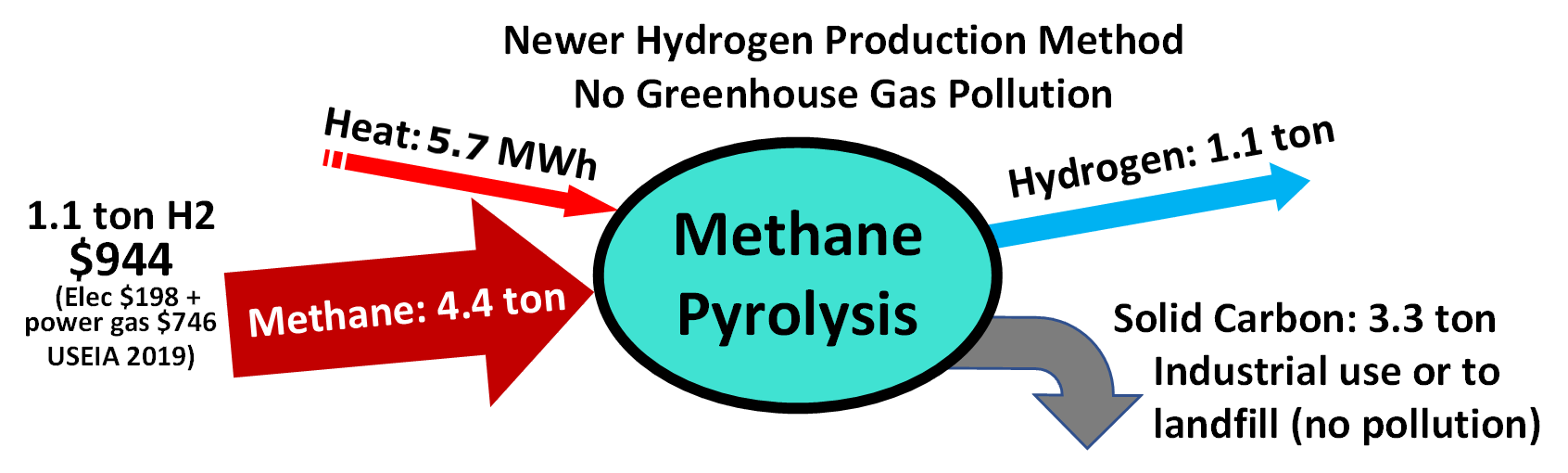
Illustrating inputs and outputs of methane pyrolysis, a process to produce hydrogen.

Sustainable production is possible by using non-polluting methane pyrolysis or generating hydrogen by water electrolysis with renewable energy sources. However, the limited availability of these renewable resources limits the use of water electrolysis. ThyssenKrupp Uhde Chlorine Engineers expanded its annual production capacity for alkaline water electrolysis to 1 gigawatt of electrolyzer capacity for this purpose.

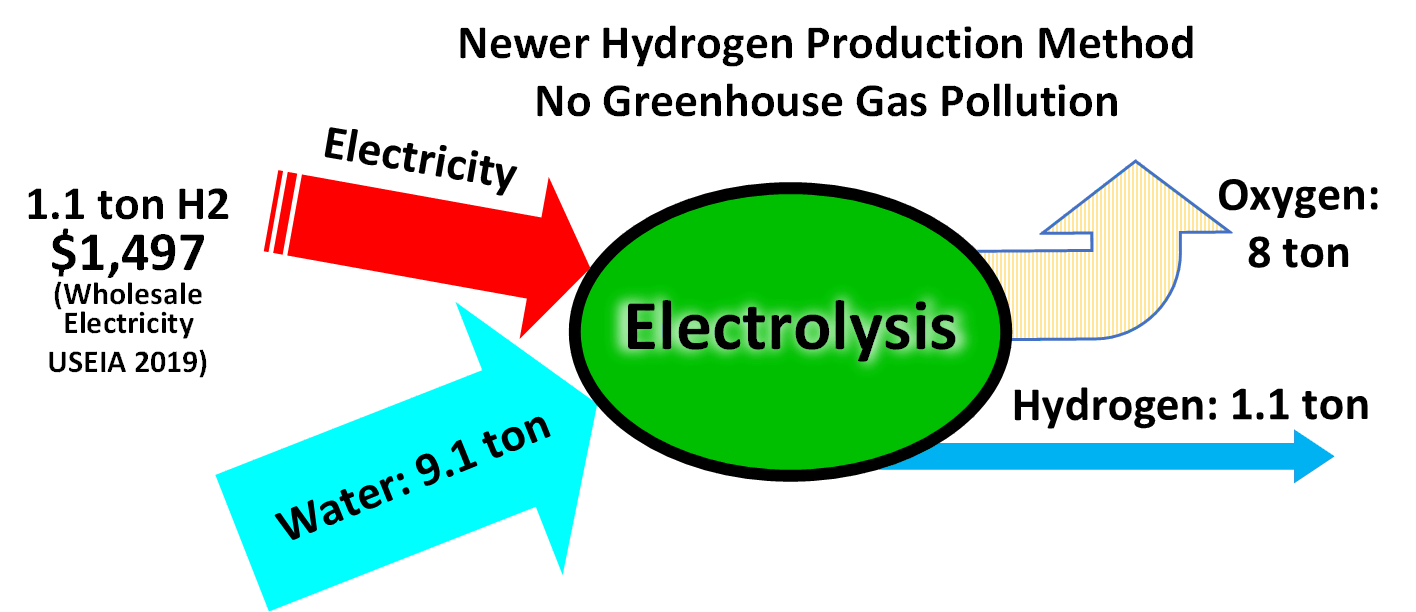
Illustrating inputs and outputs of simple electrolysis of water, for production of hydrogen.

In a hydrogen economy some hydrogen production could be diverted to feedstock use. For example, in 2002, Iceland produced 2,000 tons of hydrogen gas by electrolysis, using excess power from its hydroelectric plants, primarily for fertilizer. The Vemork hydroelectric plant in Norway used its surplus electricity output to generate renewable nitric acid from 1911 to 1971, requiring 15 MWh/ton of nitric acid. The same reaction is carried out by lightning, providing a natural source of soluble nitrates. Natural gas remains the lowest cost method.

Wastewater is often high in ammonia. Because discharging ammonia-laden water into the environment damages marine life, nitrification is often necessary to remove the ammonia. This may become a potentially sustainable source of ammonia given its abundance. Alternatively, ammonia from wastewater can be sent into an ammonia electrolyzer (ammonia electrolysis) operating with renewable energy sources to produce hydrogen and clean water. Ammonia electrolysis may require much less thermodynamic energy than water electrolysis (only 0.06 V in alkaline media).

Another option for recovering ammonia from wastewater is to use the mechanics of the ammonia-water thermal absorption cycle. Ammonia can thus be recovered either as a liquid or as ammonium hydroxide. The advantage of the former is that it is much easier to handle and transport, whereas the latter has commercial value at concentrations of 30 percent in solution.

Another option for removing ammonia from wastewater is to use Mechanical Vapor Recompression combined with distillation to extract the ammonia out. Sedron Technologies is producing ammonia that has been extracted in such a manner.

== Coal ==
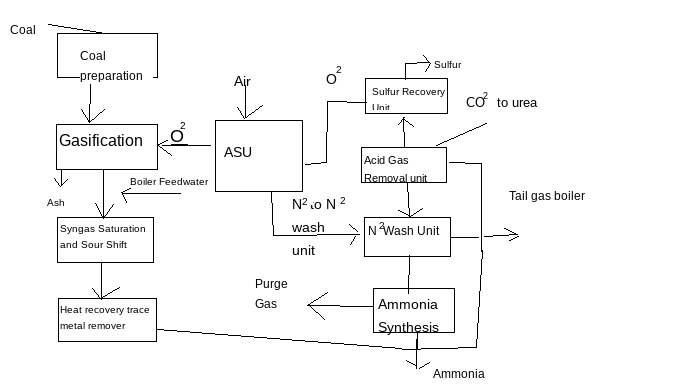
The Process to make ammonia from coal

Making ammonia from coal is mainly practised in China, where it is the main source. Oxygen from the air separation module is fed to the gasifier to convert coal into synthesis gas (H_{2}, CO, CO_{2}) and CH_{4}. Most gasifiers are based on fluidized beds that operate above atmospheric pressure and have the ability to utilize different coal feeds.

== Production plants ==
The American Oil Co in the mid-1960s positioned a single-converter ammonia plant engineered by M. W. Kellogg at Texas City, Texas, with a capacity of 544 m.t./day. It used a single-train design that received the "Kirkpatrick Chemical Engineering Achievement Award" in 1967. The plant used a four-case centrifugal compressor to compress the syngas to a pressure of 152 bar Final compression to an operating pressure of 324 bar occurred in a reciprocating compressor. Centrifugal compressors for the synthesis loop and refrigeration services provided significant cost reductions.

Almost every plant built between 1964 and 1992 had large single-train designs with syngas manufacturing at 25–35 bar and ammonia synthesis at 150–200 bar. Braun Purifier process plants utilized a primary or tubular reformer with a low outlet temperature and high methane leakage to reduce the size and cost of the reformer. Air was added to the secondary reformer to reduce the methane content of the primary reformer exit stream to 1–2%. Excess nitrogen and other impurities were erased downstream of the methanator. Because the syngas was essentially free of impurities, two axial-flow ammonia converters were used. In early 2000 Uhde developed a process that enabled plant capacities of 3300 mtpd and more. The key innovation was a single-flow synthesis loop at medium pressure in series with a conventional high-pressure synthesis loop.

=== Small-scale onsite plants ===
In April 2017, Japanese company Tsubame BHB implemented a method of ammonia synthesis that could allow economic production at scales 1-2 orders of magnitude below than ordinary plants with utilizing electrochemical catalyst.

== Green ammonia ==
In 2024, the BBC announced numerous companies were attempting to reduce the 2% of global carbon dioxide emissions caused by the use/production of ammonia by producing the product in labs. The industry has become known as "green ammonia." When an existing blast furnace is modified to use biomass as its fuel, production of both green steel and green hydrogen/ammonia are feasible.

== Byproducts and shortages due to shutdowns ==
One of the main industrial byproducts of ammonia production is CO_{2}. In 2018, high oil prices resulted in an extended summer shutdown of European ammonia factories causing a commercial CO_{2} shortage, thus limiting production of CO_{2}-based products such as beer and soft drinks. This situation repeated in September 2021 due to a 250-400% increase in the wholesale price of natural gas over the course of the year.

== See also ==
- Ammonia
- Amine gas treating
- Haber process
- Liquid nitrogen wash
- Hydrogen economy
- Methane pyrolysis
