= Sorption enhanced water gas shift =

Technology using CO2 adsorption onto a solid material

Sorption enhanced water gas shift (SEWGS) is a technology that combines a pre-combustion carbon capture process with the water gas shift reaction (WGS) in order to produce a hydrogen rich stream from the syngas fed to the SEWGS reactor.

The water gas shift reaction converts the carbon monoxide into carbon dioxide, according to the following chemical reaction:

CO + H_{2}O ⇌ CO_{2} + H_{2}

While carbon dioxide is captured and removed through an adsorption process.

The in-situ CO_{2} adsorption and removal shifts the water gas shift reaction to the right-hand side, thereby completely converting the CO and maximizing the production of high pressure hydrogen.

Since the beginning of the second decade of the 21st century this technology has started gaining attention, as it shows advantages over carbon capture conventional technologies and because hydrogen is considered the energy carrier of the future.

== Process ==
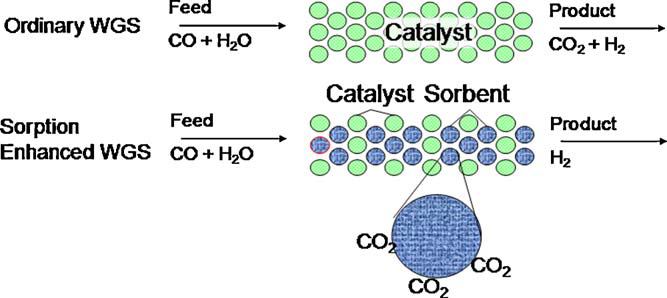
Ordinary water gas shift reaction on top. SEWGS concept on bottom.

The SEWGS technology is the combination of the water gas shift reaction with the adsorption of carbon dioxide on a solid material. Typical temperature and pressure ranges are 350-550 °C and 20-30 bar. The inlet gas of SEWGS reactors is typically a mixture of hydrogen, CO and CO_{2}, where steam is added to convert CO into CO_{2}.

The conversion of carbon monoxide into carbon dioxide is enhanced by shifting the reaction equilibrium through CO_{2} adsorption and removal, the latter being one the produced species.

The SEWGS technology is based on a multi-bed pressure swing adsorption (PSA) unit in which the vessels are filled with the water gas shift catalyst and the CO_{2} adsorbent material. Each vessel is subjected to a series of processes. In the sorption/reaction step, a high pressure hydrogen-rich stream is produced, while during sorbent regeneration a CO_{2} rich stream is generated.

The process starts feeding syngas to the SEWGS reactor, where CO_{2} is adsorbed and a hydrogen-rich stream is produced. The regeneration of the first vessel starts when the sorbent material is saturated by CO_{2}, directing the feed stream to another vessel. After the regeneration, the vessels are re-pressurized. A multibed configuration is necessary to guarantee a continuous production of hydrogen and carbon dioxide. The optimal number of beds usually varies between 6 and 8.

=== Water gas shift reaction ===
The water gas shift reaction is the reaction between carbon monoxide and steam to form hydrogen and carbon dioxide:

CO + H_{2}O ⇌ CO_{2} + H_{2}

This reaction was discovered by Felice Fontana and nowadays is adopted in a wide range of industrial applications, such as in the production process of ammonia, hydrocarbons, methanol, hydrogen and other chemicals. In the industrial practice two water gas shift sections are necessary, one at high temperature and one at low temperature, with an intersystem cooling.

=== Adsorption process ===
Example of the process scheme of a pressure swing unit.

Adsorption is the phenomenon of sorption of gases or solutes on solid or liquid surfaces. Adsorption on solid surface occurs when some substances collide with the solid surface creating bonds with the atoms or the molecules of the solid surface. There are two main adsorption processes: physical adsorption and chemical adsorption. The first one is the result of the interaction of intermolecular forces. Since weak bonds are formed, the adsorbed substance can be easily separated. In chemical adsorption, chemical bonds are formed, meaning that the absorption or release of adsorption heat and the activation energy are larger with respect to physical adsorption. These two processes often take place simultaneously. The adsorbent material is then regenerated through desorption, which is the opposite phenomenon of sorption, releasing the captured substance from the adsorbent material.

In SEWGS technology the pressure swing adsorption (PSA) process is employed to regenerate the adsorbent material and produce a CO_{2} rich stream. The process is similar to the one conventionally used for air separation, hydrogen purification and other gas separations.

=== Conventional technology for carbon dioxide removal ===
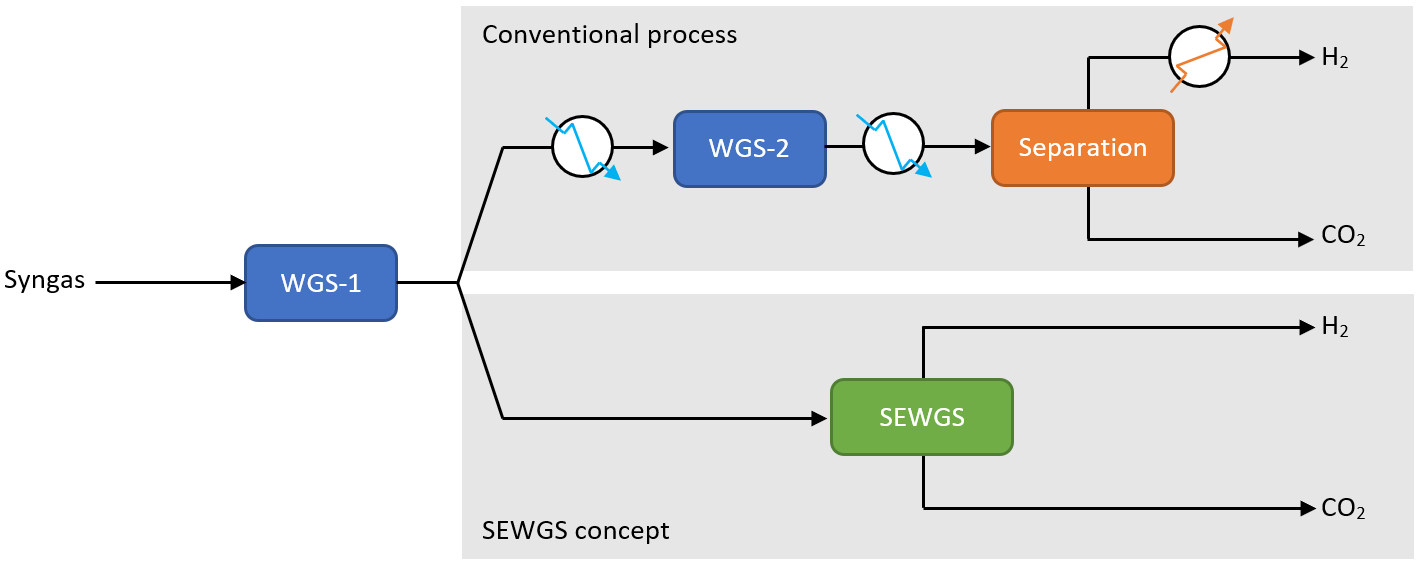
Process schemes for pre-combustion CO_{2} capture. Top: conventional scheme for a conventional technology. Bottom: scheme for the SEWGS concept.

The industrially used technology for carbon dioxide removal is called amine washing technology and is based on chemical absorption of carbon dioxide. In chemical absorption, reactions between the absorbed substance (CO_{2}) and the solvent occur and produce a rich liquid. Then, the rich liquid enters the desorption column where carbon dioxide is separated from the sorbent which is reused for CO_{2} absorption. Ethanolamine (C_{2}H_{7}NO), diethanolamine (C_{4}H_{11}NO_{2}), triethanolamine (C_{6}H_{15}NO_{3}) mono-ethanolamine (C_{2}H_{7}NO) and methyl-diethanolamine (C_{5}H_{13}NO_{2}) are commonly used for the removal of CO_{2}.

=== Advantages of SEWGS over conventional technologies ===
SEWGS technology shows some advantages in comparison with traditional technologies adoptable for pre-combustion removal of carbon dioxide. Traditional technologies require employing two water gas shift reactors (a high temperature and a low temperature stage) in order to get high conversions of carbon monoxide into carbon dioxide with an intermediate cooling stage between the two reactors. In addition, another cooling stage is necessary at the outlet of the second WGS reactor for the CO_{2} capture with a solvent. Furthermore, the hydrogen rich stream at the outlet of SEWGS section can be directly fed into a gas turbine, while the hydrogen rich stream produced by the traditional route needs a further heating stage.

== Applications ==
The importance of this technology is directly related to the problem of global warming and the mitigation of the carbon dioxide emissions. In hydrogen economy hydrogen is considered a clean energy carrier with high energy content and is expected to replace fossil fuels and other energy sources associated with pollution issues. For these reasons, since the beginning of second decade of the 21st century this technology attracted the public interest.

The SEWGS technology enables producing high-purity hydrogen without need for further purification processes. It furthermore finds potential application in a wide range of industrial processes, such as in the production of electricity from fossil fuels or in the iron and steel industry.

The integration of the SEWGS process in natural gas combined cycle (NGCC) and integrated gasification combined cycle (IGCC) power plants has been investigated as a possible way to produce electricity from natural gas or coal with almost-zero emissions. In NGCC power plant the carbon capture achieved is around 95% with a CO_{2} purity over 99%, while in IGCC power plants the carbon capture ratio is around 90% with a CO_{2} purity of 99%.

The investigation of SEWGS integration in steel mills started during the second decade of 21st century. The goal is to reduce the carbon footprint of this industrial process that is responsible of the 6% of total global CO_{2} emissions and 16% of the emissions generated by industrial processes.

The captured and removed CO_{2} can be then stored or used for the production of high value chemical products.

== Sorbents for SEWGS process ==
The reactor vessels are loaded with sorbent pellets. Sorbent must have the following features:

- high CO_{2} capacity and selectivity over H_{2}
- low H_{2}O adsorption
- low specific cost
- mechanical stability under pressure and temperature variation
- chemical stability in the presence of impurities
- easy regeneration by steam

Different sorbent materials have been investigated to the purpose of being employed in SEWGS. Some examples include:

- K_{2}CO_{3}-promoted hydrotalcite
- potassium promoted alumina
- Na–Mg double salt
- CaO

Potassium promoted hydrotalcite is the most studied sorbent material for SEWGS application. Its principal features are listed below:

- low cost
- sufficiently high CO_{2} cyclic working capacity
- fast adsorption kinetics
- good mechanical stability

== See also ==
- Water-gas shift reaction
- Adsorption
- Carbon capture and storage
- Carbon capture and utilization
