= Lane hydrogen producer =

Device that produces hydrogen from steam

The Lane hydrogen producer was an apparatus for hydrogen production based on the steam-iron process and water gas invented in 1903 by a British engineer, Howard Lane.

== History ==
The first commercial Lane hydrogen producer was commissioned in 1904. By 1913, 850,000,000 cubic feet (24,000,000 m^{3}) of hydrogen was manufactured annually by this process.

In the early-part of the 20th century, the process found some use as a means of producing hydrogen lifting gas for airships, as it could produce large volumes of gas cheaply. Lane producers were installed at some British airship stations so the gas could be manufactured on-site. To work efficiently however, the plant required skilled operators and to be running as a quasi-continuous process. A competing process, referred to as the Silicol Process, reacted Ferrosilicon with a strong Sodium hydroxide solution and had the advantage of flexibility.

In the 1940s the Lane process was superseded by cheaper methods of hydrogen production that used oil or natural gas as a feedstock.

== Process description ==
Where hydrogen was commonly produced with the single retort like the Messerschmitt and the Bamag type, Lane introduced the multiple retort type. In the Lane generator water gas was used to heat the retorts up to 600-800 °C after which water gas-air was used in the retorts. In the steam-iron process the iron oxidizes and has to be replaced with fresh metal, in the Lane hydrogen producer the iron oxide is reduced with water gas back to its metallic condition, after which the process restarts.

The chemical reactions are

3Fe+ 4H_{2}O → Fe_{3}O_{4} + 4H_{2}

Fe_{3}O_{4}+ 4CO → 3Fe + 4CO_{2}

The net chemical reaction is:

CO + H_{2}O → CO_{2} + H_{2}

== See also ==
- Iron oxide cycle
- Sponge iron reaction
- Water gas shift reaction
- Timeline of hydrogen technologies
- Chemical looping combustion
