= Dissociative adsorption =

Type of adsorption process

Dissociative adsorption is a process in which a molecule adsorbs onto a surface and simultaneously dissociates into two or more fragments. This process is the basis of many applications, particularly in heterogeneous catalysis reactions. The dissociation involves cleaving of the molecular bonds in the adsorbate, and formation of new bonds with the substrate.

Breaking the atomic bonds of the dissociating molecule requires a large amount of energy, thus dissociative adsorption is an example of chemisorption, where strong adsorbate-substrate bonds are created. These bonds can be atomic, ionic or metallic in nature. In contrast to dissociative adsorption, in molecular adsorption the adsorbate stays intact as it bonds with the surface. Often, a molecular adsorption state can act as a precursor in the adsorption process, after which the molecule can dissociate only after sufficient additional energy is available.

A dissociative adsorption process may be homolytic or heterolytic, depending on how the electrons participating in the molecular bond are divided in the dissociation process. In homolytic dissociative adsorption, electrons are divided evenly between the fragments, while in heterolytic dissociation, both electrons of a bond are transferred to one fragment.

== Kinetic theory ==
=== In the Langmuir model ===
The Langmuir model of adsorption assumes

1. The maximum coverage is one adsorbate molecule per substrate site.
2. Independent and equivalent adsorption sites.

This model is the simplest useful approximation that still retains the dependence of the adsorption rate on the coverage, and in the simplest case, precursor states are not considered. For dissociative adsorption to be possible, each incident molecule requires n available adsorption sites, where n is the number of dissociated fragments. The probability of an incident molecule impacting a site with a valid configuration has the form

$f(\theta) = (1-\theta)^n$,

when the existing coverage is θ and the dissociative products are mobile on the surface. The order of the kinetics for the process is n. The order of kinetics has implications for the sticking coefficient

$s = s_0(1-\theta)^n$,

where $s_0$ denotes the initial sticking coefficient or the sticking coefficient at 0 coverage. The adsorption kinetics are given by

$\theta = \frac{s_0It}{1+s_0It}$ for (n=2),

where I is the impinging flux of molecules on the surface. The shape of the coverage function over time is different for each kinetic order, so assuming desorption is negligible, dissociative adsorption for a system following the Langmuir model can be determined by monitoring the adsorption rate as a function of time under a constant impinging flux.

=== Precursor states ===
Often the adsorbing molecule does not dissociate directly upon contact with the surface, but is instead first bound to an intermediate precursor state. The molecule can then attempt to dissociate to the final state through fluctuations. The precursor molecules can be intrinsic, meaning they occupy an empty site, or extrinsic, meaning they are bound on top of an already occupied site. The energies of these states can also be different, resulting in different forms of the overall sticking coefficient $f(\theta)$. If extrinsic and intrinsic sites are assumed energetically equivalent and the adsorption rate to the precursor state is assumed to follow the Langmuir model, the following expression for the coverage dependence of the overall sticking coefficient is obtained:

$f(\theta) = \frac{(1+K)(1-\theta)^n}{1+K(1-\theta)^n}$,

where K is the ratio between the rate constants of dissociation and desorption reactions of the precursor.

=== Temperature dependence ===
The behaviour of the sticking coefficient as a function of temperature is governed by the shape of the potential energy surface of adsorption. For the direct mechanism, the sticking coefficient is almost temperature independent, because for most systems $E_{ads}\gg k_BT$. When a precursor state is involved, thermal fluctuations determine the probability of the weakly bound precursor either dissociating into the final state or escaping the surface. The initial sticking coefficient is related to the energy barrier for dissociation $\epsilon_{a}$ and desorption $\epsilon_{d}$, and their rate constants $\nu_a$ and $\nu_a$ as

$s_0 = \left( 1 + \frac{\nu_d}{\nu_a}exp\left( -\frac{\epsilon_d-\epsilon_a}{k_BT} \right) \right)^{-1}$.

From this arises two distinct cases for the temperature dependence:

- When $\epsilon_d<\epsilon_a$, the sticking coefficient increases with substrate temperature. This is the case of activated adsorption
- When $\epsilon_d>\epsilon_a$, the sticking coefficient decreases as substrate temperature increases. This is the behaviour of non-activated adsorption.

By measuring the sticking coefficient at different temperatures, it is then possible to extract the value of $\epsilon_d-\epsilon_a$.

== Experimental techniques ==
The measurement of adsorption properties relies on controlling and measuring the surface coverage and conditions, including the substrate temperature, impinging molecular flux or partial pressure. To detect dissociation on the surface, additional techniques that can distinguish surface ordering due to the interaction of dissociated fragments, identify desorbed particles, determine the order of kinetics or measure the chemical bond energies of the adsorbed species are required. In many experiments, a combination of multiple methods that probe different surface properties is used to form a complete picture of the adsorbed species. Comparisons between the experimental adsorption energy and simulated energies for dissociative and molecular adsorption can also indicate the type of adsorption for a system

For measurement of adsorption isotherms, a controlled gas pressure and temperature determine the coverage when adsorption and desorption rates are in balance. The coverage can then be measured with various surface sensitive methods like AES or XPS. Often, the coverage can also be related to a change in the surface work function, which can enable faster measurements in otherwise challenging conditions. The shape of the isotherms is sensitive to the order of kinetics of the adsorption and desorption processes, and though the exact forms can be difficult to find, simulations have been used to find general functional forms for isotherms of dissociative adsorption for specific systems.

XPS is a surface sensitive method that allows the direct probing of the chemical bonds of the surface atoms, thus being capable of differentiating bond energies corresponding to intact molecules or dissociated fragments. A challenge with this method is that the incident photons can induce surface modifications that are difficult to separate from the effects to be measured. LEED patterns are often combined with other measurements to verify surface structure and recognize ordering of the adsorbates.

Temperature programmed desorption (TPD or TDS) can be used to measure the properties of desorption, namely the desorption energy, order of desorption kinetics and the initial surface coverage. The desorption order contains information about the mechanisms like recombination required for the desorption process. As TPD also measures the masses of the desorbed particles, it can be used to detect individually desorbed dissociated fragments or their different combinations. Presence of masses different from the original molecules, or the detection of additional desorption peaks with higher order kinetics can indicate that the adsorption is dissociative.

== Modeling ==
Density functional theory (DFT) can be used to calculate the change in energy caused by the adsorption and dissociation of molecules. The activation energy is calculated as the highest energy point on the optimal molecular paths of the fragments as they transform from the initial molecular state to the dissociated state. This is the saddle point of the potential energy surface of the process.

Properties for dissociative adsorption of example gases from DFT
Reaction	number of sites	sites	$E_{ads}\;\textrm{[kcal/mol]}$
NO + Ni(100) → N/Ni(100) + O/Ni(100)	2	hl	-33.7
H_{2}O + Pd(111) → OH/Pd(111) + H/Pd(111)	2	top + fcc	7.15
H_{2} + Ni(111) → 2H/Ni(111)	2	hl	-23.9
H_{2} + Pd(111) → 2H/Pd(111)	2	fcc	-23.3

Another approach for considering the stretching and dissociation of adsorbates is through the charge-transfer between the electron bands near the Fermi surface using molecular orbital (MO) theory. A strong charge transfer caused by overlap of unoccupied and occupied orbitals weakens the molecular bonds, which lowers or eliminates the barrier for dissociation. The charge transfer can be local or delocalized in terms of the substrate electrons, depending on which orbitals participate in the interaction. The simplest method used for approximating the electronic structure of systems using MO theory is Hartree-Fock self-consistent field, which can be extended to include electron correlations through various approximations.

== Applications and examples ==
=== Water and transition metals ===
In atmospheric conditions, the adsorption of water and oxygen on transition metal surfaces is a well studied phenomenon. It has also been found that dissociated oxygen content on a surface lowers the activation energy for the dissociation of water, which on a clean metal surface can have a high barrier for dissociation. This is explained by the oxygen atoms binding with one hydrogen of the adsorbing water molecule to form an energetically favourable hydroxyl group. Likewise, molecular pre-adsorbed water can be used to lower the barrier for dissociation of oxygen that is needed in metal-catalyzed oxidation reactions. The relevant effects for this promoting role are hydrogen bonding between the water molecule and oxygen, and the electronic modification of the surface by the adsorbed water.

On clean close-packed surfaces of Ag, Au, Pt, Rh and Ni, dissociated oxygen prefers adsorption to hollow sites. Hydroxyl and molecular water prefers to adsorb on low coordination top sites, while the dissociated hydrogen atoms prefer hollow sites for most transition metals. A typical dissociation pathway on these metals is that as a top-site adsorbed molecule dissociates, at least one fragment migrates to a bridge or hollow site.

The formation and dissociation of water on transition metals like palladium has important applications in reactions for obtaining hydrogen and for the operation of proton-exchange membrane fuel cells, and much research has been conducted to understand the phenomenon. The rate-determining reaction for water formation is the creation of adsorbed OH. However, details of the specific adsorption sites and preferred reaction pathways for water formation have been difficult to determine. From kinetic Monte Carlo simulations combined with DFT calculations of the reaction energetics, it has been found that water formation on Pd(111) is dominated by step-edges through a combination of reactions:

O + H → OH
OO + H → OOH
OOH → OH + H
OH + OH → H_{2}O + O
OH + H → H_{2}O

At low temperatures and low relative pressure of H_{2}, the dominant reaction path for hydroxyl group formation is the direct association of O and H, and the ratios of each reaction path vary significantly in different conditions.

=== Metal-catalyzed oxidation ===
The oxidation of carbon monoxide in catalytic converters utilizes a transition metal surface as a catalyst in the reaction

2CO + O_{2} → 2CO_{2}.

This system has been extensively studied to minimize the emissions of toxic CO from internal combustion engines, and there is a trade-off in the preparation of the Pt catalyst surface between the dissociative adsorption of oxygen and the sticking of CO to the metal surface. A larger step density increases the dissociation of oxygen, but at the same time decreases the probability of CO oxidation. The optimal configuration for the reaction is with a CO on a flat terrace and a dissociated O at a step edge.

=== Hydrogen economy ===
The most prevalent method for hydrogen production, steam reforming, relies on transition metal catalysts which dissociatively adsorb the initial molecules of the reaction to form intermediates, which then can recombine to form gaseous hydrogen. Kinetic models of the possible dissociative adsorption paths have been used to simulate the properties of the reaction.

A method for hydrogen purification involves passing the gas through a thin film of Pd-Ag alloy between two gas vessels. The hydrogen gas dissociates on the surface of the film, after which the individual atoms are able to diffuse through the metal, and recombine to form a higher hydrogen content atmosphere inside the low-pressure receiving vessel.

A challenge with hydrogen storage and transport through conventional steel vessels is hydrogen-induced-cracking, where a hydrogen atoms enter the container walls through dissociative adsorption. If enough partial pressure builds up inside the material, this can cause cracks, blistering or embrittlement of the walls.

== See also ==
- Adsorption
- Chemisorption
