= Sponge iron reaction =

Chemical process

The sponge iron reaction (SIR) is a chemical process based on redox cycling of an iron-based contact mass, the first cycle is a conversion step between iron metal (Fe) and wuestite (FeO), the second cycle is a conversion step between wuestite (FeO) and magnetite (Fe_{3}O_{4}). In application, the SIT is used in the reformer sponge iron cycle (RESC) in combination with a steam reforming unit.

== Process description ==
The process has two modes, a reduction mode and an oxidation mode.

=== Iron-wuestite ===
FeO + H_{2} ↔ Fe + H_{2}O

=== Magnetite-wuestite ===
Fe_{3}O_{4} + H_{2} ↔ 3FeO + H_{2}O

== Application ==
The reformer sponge iron cycle is a two step cycle to produce hydrogen from hydrocarbon fuels based SIR and steam.

=== Reformer sponge iron cycle ===
In the first step the hydrocarbon fuel is reformed to syngas in the reformer which is then used to reduce the iron oxide (magnetite—Fe_{3}O_{4}) to iron (wüstite—FeO), in the second step steam is utilized to re-oxidise the iron into magnetite and hydrogen. The iron oxide pellets are placed in a pelletbed and have a service life of several thousand redox cycles.

== See also ==
- Packed bed
- Steam reforming
