= Hydrocarbon fuel =

Hydrocarbon fuel is fuel that consists mostly of hydrocarbons. It may refer to:

- Fossil fuel, derived from coal, oil, or natural gas
- Biofuel, derived from plant or animal matter
- Synthetic fuel, derived from synthesis gas
- Electrofuel, derived from carbon dioxide
- Peat, naturally occurring carbon-rich build up of vegetation
