= Steam reforming =

Method for producing hydrogen and carbon monoxide from hydrocarbon fuels

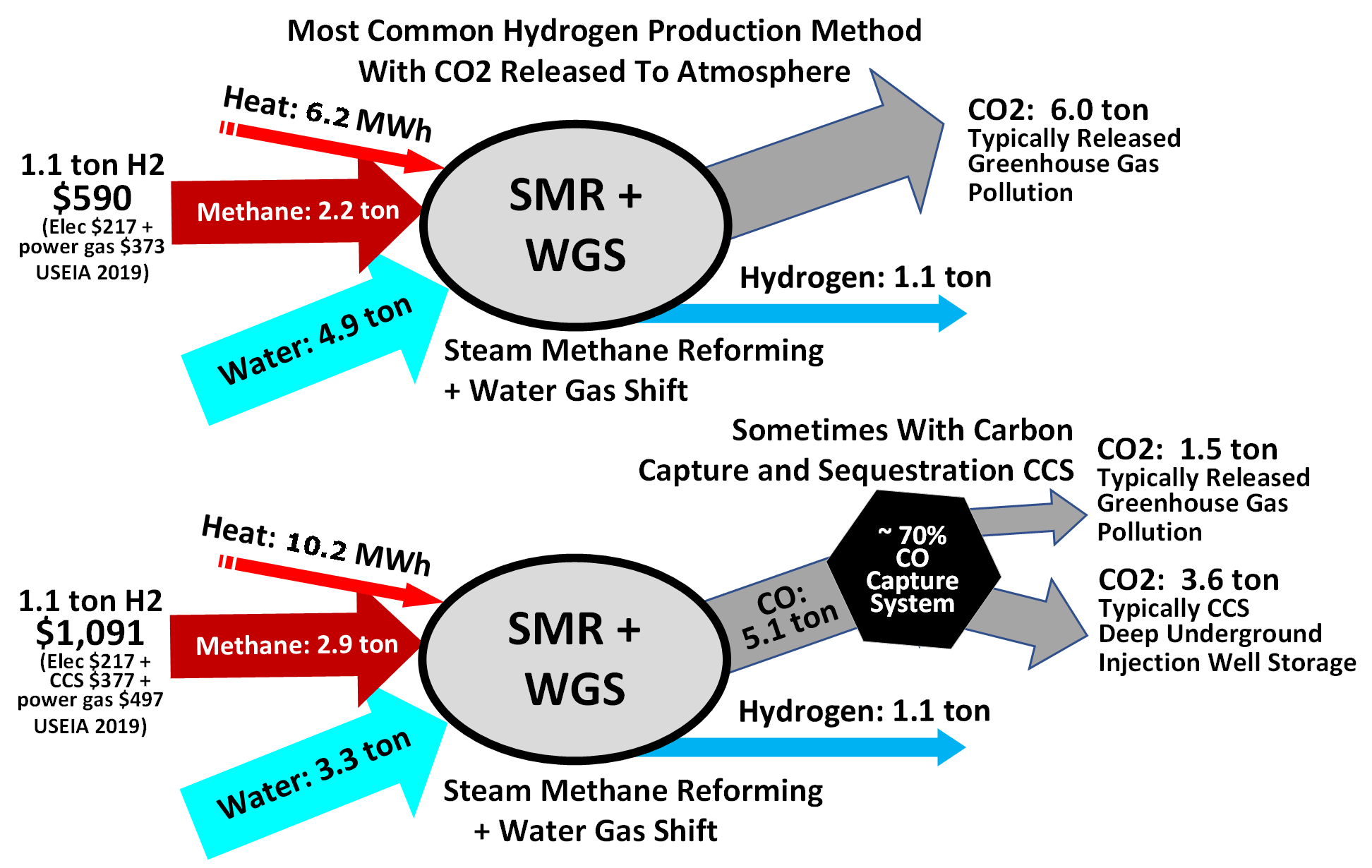
Illustrating inputs and outputs of steam reforming of natural gas, a process to produce hydrogen and CO_{2} greenhouse gas that may be captured with CCS

Steam reforming or steam methane reforming (SMR) is a method for producing synthesis gas (hydrogen and carbon monoxide) by reaction of hydrocarbons with water. Commonly, natural gas is the feedstock. The main purpose of this technology is often hydrogen production, although syngas has multiple other uses such as production of ammonia or methanol. The reaction is represented by this equilibrium:

$$\ce{CH4 + H2O <=> CO + 3 H2}$$

The reaction is strongly endothermic (ΔH_{SR} = 206 kJ/mol).

Hydrogen produced by steam reforming is termed 'grey' hydrogen when the waste carbon dioxide is released to the atmosphere and 'blue' hydrogen when the carbon dioxide is (mostly) captured and stored geologically—see carbon capture and storage. Zero carbon 'green' hydrogen is produced by thermochemical water splitting, using solar thermal, low- or zero-carbon electricity or waste heat, or electrolysis, using low- or zero-carbon electricity. Zero carbon emissions 'turquoise' hydrogen is produced by one-step methane pyrolysis of natural gas.

Steam reforming of natural gas produces most of the world's hydrogen. Hydrogen is used in the industrial synthesis of ammonia and other chemicals.

== Reactions ==
Steam reforming reaction kinetics, in particular using nickel-alumina catalysts, have been studied in detail since the 1950s.

=== Pre-reforming ===
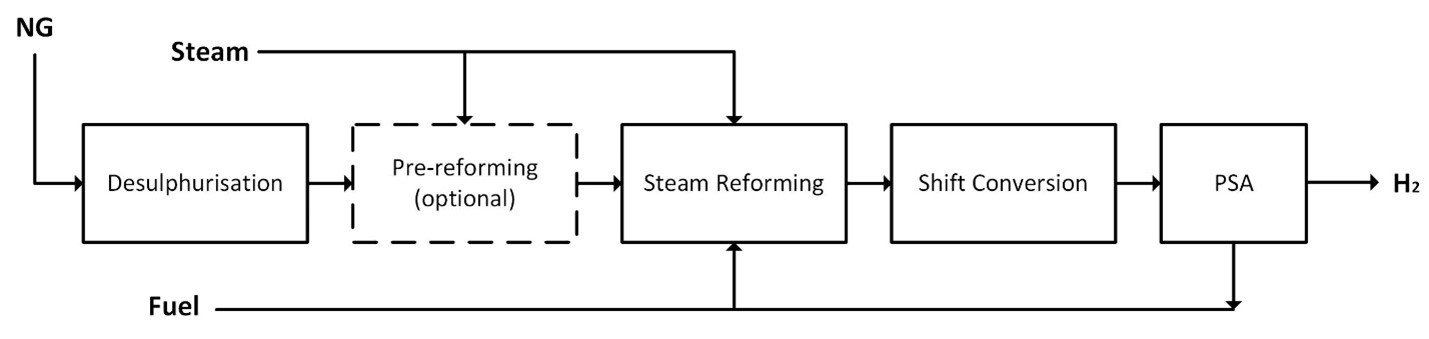
Depiction of the general process flow of a typical steam reforming plant. (PSA = Pressure swing adsorption, NG = Natural gas)

The purpose of pre-reforming is to break down higher hydrocarbons such as propane, butane or naphtha into methane (CH_{4}), which allows for more efficient reforming downstream.

=== Steam reforming ===
The name-giving reaction is the steam reforming (SR) reaction and is expressed by the equation:

$[1]\qquad \mathrm{CH}_4 + \mathrm{H}_2\mathrm{O} \rightleftharpoons \mathrm{CO} + 3\,\mathrm{H}_2 \qquad \Delta H_{SR} = 206\ \mathrm{kJ/mol}$

Via the water-gas shift reaction (WGSR), additional hydrogen is released by reaction of water with the carbon monoxide generated according to equation [1]:

$[2]\qquad \mathrm{CO} + \mathrm{H}_2\mathrm{O} \rightleftharpoons \mathrm{CO}_2 + \mathrm{H}_2 \qquad \Delta H_{WGSR} = -41\ \mathrm{kJ/mol}$

Some additional reactions occurring within steam reforming processes have been studied. Commonly the direct steam reforming (DSR) reaction is also included:

$[3]\qquad \mathrm{CH}_4 + 2\,\mathrm{H}_2\mathrm{O} \rightleftharpoons \mathrm{CO}_2 + 4\,\mathrm{H}_2 \qquad \Delta H_{DSR} = 165\ \mathrm{kJ/mol}$

As these reactions by themselves are highly endothermic (apart from WGSR, which is mildly exothermic), a large amount of heat needs to be added to the reactor to keep a constant temperature. Optimal SMR reactor operating conditions lie within a temperature range of 800 °C to 900 °C at medium pressures of 20-30 bar. High excess of steam is required, expressed by the (molar) steam-to-carbon (S/C) ratio. Typical S/C ratio values lie within the range 2.5:1 - 3:1.

== Industrial practice ==
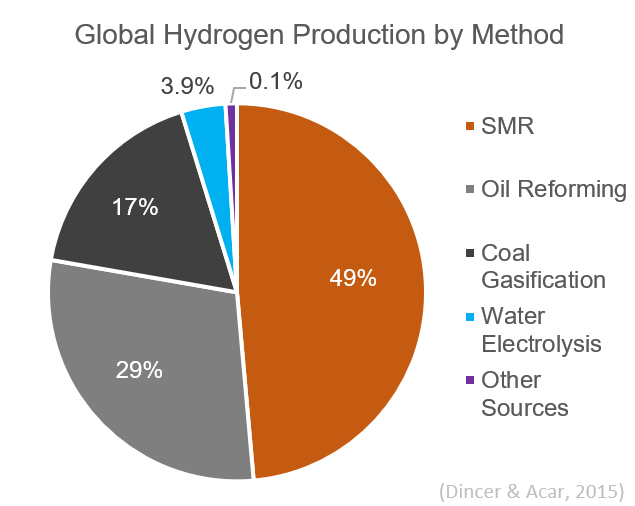
Global Hydrogen Production by Method

The reaction is conducted in multitubular packed bed reactors, a subtype of the plug flow reactor category. These reactors consist of an array of long and narrow tubes which are situated within the combustion chamber of a large industrial furnace, providing the necessary energy to keep the reactor at a constant temperature during operation. Furnace designs vary, depending on the burner configuration; they are typically categorized into top-fired, bottom-fired, and side-fired. A notable design is the Foster-Wheeler terrace wall reformer.

Inside the tubes, a mixture of steam and methane is put into contact with a nickel catalyst. Catalysts with high surface-area-to-volume ratio are preferred because of diffusion limitations due to high operating temperature. Examples of catalyst shapes used are spoked wheels, gear wheels, and rings with holes (Raschig rings). Additionally, these shapes have a low pressure drop which is advantageous for this application.

Steam reforming of natural gas is 65–75% efficient.

The United States produces 9–10 million tons of hydrogen per year, mostly with steam reforming of natural gas. The worldwide ammonia production, using hydrogen derived from steam reforming, was 144 million tonnes in 2018. Energy consumption has been reduced from 100 GJ/tonne of ammonia in 1920 to 27 GJ by 2019.

Globally, almost 50% of hydrogen is produced via steam reforming. It is currently the least expensive method for hydrogen production available in terms of its capital cost.

In an effort to decarbonise hydrogen production, carbon capture and storage (CCS) methods are being implemented within the industry, which have the potential to remove up to 90% of CO_{2} produced from the process. Despite this, implementation of this technology remains problematic, costly, and increases the price of the produced hydrogen significantly.

== Autothermal reforming ==
Autothermal reforming (ATR) uses oxygen, carbon dioxide, or steam to react with methane to form syngas. The reaction takes place in a single chamber where the methane is partially oxidized. The reaction is exothermic. When the ATR uses carbon dioxide, the H_{2}:CO ratio produced is 1:1; when the ATR uses steam, the H_{2}:CO ratio produced is 2.5:1. The outlet temperature of the syngas is between 950–1100 °C and the outlet pressure can be as high as 100 bar.

In addition to reactions [1] – [3], ATR introduces the following reaction:

$[4]\qquad \mathrm{CH}_4 + 0.5\,\mathrm{O}_2 \rightleftharpoons \mathrm{CO} + 2\,\mathrm{H}_2 \qquad \Delta H_{R} = -24.5\ \mathrm{kJ/mol}$

The main difference between SMR and ATR is that SMR uses air as the combustion heat source to generate steam, whereas ATR uses purified oxygen. The advantage of ATR is that the H_{2}:CO ratio can be varied, which can be useful for producing speciality products. Due to the exothermic nature of some of the additional reactions occurring within ATR, the process can essentially be performed at a net enthalpy of zero (ΔH = 0).

== Partial oxidation ==
Partial oxidation (POX) occurs when a sub-stoichiometric fuel-air mixture is partially combusted in a reformer creating hydrogen-rich syngas. POX is typically much faster than steam reforming and requires a smaller reactor vessel. POX produces less hydrogen per unit of the input fuel than steam reforming of the same fuel.

== Steam reforming at small scale ==
The capital cost of steam reforming plants is considered prohibitive for small to medium size applications. The costs for these elaborate facilities do not scale down well. Conventional steam reforming plants operate at pressures between 200 and 600 psi (14–40 bar) with outlet temperatures in the range of 815 to 925 °C.

=== For combustion engines ===
Flared gas and vented volatile organic compounds (VOCs) are known problems in the offshore industry and in the on-shore oil and gas industry, since both release greenhouse gases into the atmosphere. Reforming for combustion engines utilizes steam reforming technology for converting waste gases into a source of energy.

Reforming for combustion engines is based on steam reforming, where non-methane hydrocarbons (NMHCs) of low quality gases are converted to synthesis gas (H_{2} + CO) and finally to methane (CH_{4}), carbon dioxide (CO_{2}) and hydrogen (H_{2}) - thereby improving the fuel gas quality (methane number).

=== For fuel cells ===
There is also interest in the development of much smaller units based on similar technology to produce hydrogen as a feedstock for fuel cells. Small-scale steam reforming units to supply fuel cells are currently the subject of research and development, typically involving the reforming of methanol, but other fuels are also being considered such as propane, gasoline, autogas, diesel fuel, and ethanol.

==== Disadvantages ====
The reformer – the fuel-cell system is still being researched, but in the near term, systems would continue to run on existing fuels, such as natural gas, gasoline or diesel. However, there is an ongoing debate about whether using these fuels to produce hydrogen is beneficial, given global warming. Fossil fuel reforming does not eliminate carbon dioxide emissions into the atmosphere but reduces them and nearly eliminates carbon monoxide emissions compared to burning conventional fuels, due to increased efficiency and fuel cell characteristics. However, by turning the release of carbon dioxide into a point source rather than distributed release, carbon capture and storage becomes a possibility, which would prevent the release of carbon dioxide to the atmosphere, while adding to the cost of the process.

The cost of hydrogen production by reforming fossil fuels depends on the scale at which it is done, the capital cost of the reformer, and the efficiency of the unit, so that whilst it may cost only a few dollars per kilogram of hydrogen at an industrial scale, it could be more expensive at the smaller scale needed for fuel cells.

==== Challenges with reformers supplying fuel cells ====
There are several challenges associated with this technology:

- The reforming reaction takes place at high temperatures, making it slow to start up and requiring costly high-temperature materials.
- Sulfur compounds in the fuel will poison certain catalysts, making it difficult to run this type of system from ordinary gasoline. Some new technologies have overcome this challenge with sulfur-tolerant catalysts.
- Coking would be another cause of catalyst deactivation during steam reforming. High reaction temperatures, low steam-to-carbon ratio (S/C), and the complex nature of sulfur-containing commercial hydrocarbon fuels make coking especially favorable. Olefins, typically ethylene, and aromatics are well-known carbon-precursors, hence their formation must be reduced during steam reforming. Additionally, catalysts with lower acidity were reported to be less prone to coking by suppressing dehydrogenation reactions. H_{2}S, the main product in the reforming of organic sulfur, can bind to all transition metal catalysts to form metal–sulfur bonds and subsequently reduce catalyst activity by inhibiting the chemisorption of reforming reactants. Meanwhile, the adsorbed sulfur species increases the catalyst acidity, and hence indirectly promotes coking. Precious metal catalysts such as Rh and Pt have lower tendencies to form bulk sulfides than other metal catalysts such as Ni. Rh and Pt are less prone to sulfur poisoning by only chemisorbing sulfur rather than forming metal sulfides.
- Low temperature polymer fuel cell membranes can be poisoned by the carbon monoxide (CO) produced by the reactor, making it necessary to include complex CO-removal systems. Solid oxide fuel cells (SOFC) and molten carbonate fuel cells (MCFC) do not have this problem, but operate at higher temperatures, slowing start-up time, and requiring costly materials and bulky insulation.
- The thermodynamic efficiency of the process is between 70% and 85% (LHV basis) depending on the purity of the hydrogen product.

== See also ==
- Biogas
- Boudouard reaction
- Catalytic reforming
- Chemical looping reforming and gasification
- Cracking (chemistry)
- Hydrogen pinch
- Hydrogen technologies
- Industrial gas
- Lane hydrogen producer
- Methane pyrolysis (for Hydrogen)
- Partial oxidation
- PROX
- Reformed methanol fuel cell
- Reformer sponge iron cycle
- Syngas
- Timeline of hydrogen technologies
