= Partial oxidation =

Oxidation process stopping before full combustion

Partial oxidation (POX) is a type of chemical reaction. It occurs when a substoichiometric fuel-air mixture is partially combusted in a reformer, creating a hydrogen-rich syngas which can then be put to further use, for example in a fuel cell. A distinction is made between thermal partial oxidation (TPOX) and catalytic partial oxidation (CPOX).

== Principle ==
Partial oxidation is a technically mature process in which natural gas or a heavy hydrocarbon fuel (heating oil) is mixed with a limited amount of oxygen in an exothermic process.

- General reaction: $\ce{C_\mathit{n}H_\mathit{m} + \frac\mathit{n}{2}{O2} -> \mathit{n}{CO} + \frac\mathit{m}{2}H2}$
- Idealized reaction for heating oil: $\ce{{C12H24} + 6O2 -> {12CO} + 12H2}$
- Idealized reaction for coal: $\ce{{C24H12} + 12O2 -> {24CO} + 6H2}$

The formulas given for coal and heating oil show only a typical representative of these complex fuels. Water may be added to lower the combustion temperature and reduce soot formation. Yields are below stoichiometric due to some fuel being fully combusted to carbon dioxide and water.

== TPOX ==
TPOX (thermal partial oxidation) reaction temperatures are dependent on the air-fuel ratio or oxygen-fuel ratio. Typical reaction temperatures are 1200°C and above.

== CPOX ==
In CPOX (catalytic partial oxidation) the use of a catalyst reduces the required temperature to around 800°C – 900°C.

The choice of reforming technique depends on the sulfur content of the fuel being used. CPOX can be employed if the sulfur content is below 50 ppm. A higher sulfur content can poison the catalyst, so the TPOX procedure is used for such fuels. However, recent research shows that CPOX is possible with sulfur contents up to 400ppm.

== History ==
1926 – Vandeveer and Parr at the University of Illinois used oxygen to replace air.

== See also ==
- Hydrogen production
- Industrial gas
- PROX
- Small stationary reformer
- Glossary of fuel cell terms
- Timeline of hydrogen technologies
