= Syngas =

Fossil fuel derived from other hydrocarbon sources

Syngas, or synthesis gas, is a mixture of hydrogen and carbon monoxide in various ratios. The gas often contains some carbon dioxide and methane. It is principally used for producing ammonia or methanol. Syngas is combustible and can be used as a fuel.

== Formation ==
Syngas is formed by steam reforming or partial oxidation of natural gas or liquid hydrocarbons, or coal gasification.

C + H_{2}O → CO + H_{2}

CO + H_{2}O → CO_{2} + H_{2}

C + CO_{2} → 2CO

Steam reforming of methane is an endothermic reaction requiring 206 kJ/mol of energy:

CH_{4} + H_{2}O → CO + 3 H_{2}

In principle, but rarely in practice, biomass and related hydrocarbon feedstocks could be used to generate biogas and biochar in waste-to-energy gasification facilities. The gas generated (mostly methane and carbon dioxide) is sometimes described as syngas but its composition differs from syngas. Generation of conventional syngas (mostly H_{2} and CO) from waste biomass has been explored.

== Composition, pathway for formation, and thermochemistry ==
The chemical composition of syngas varies based on the raw materials and the processes. Syngas produced by coal gasification generally is a mixture of 30 to 60% carbon monoxide, 25 to 30% hydrogen, 5 to 15% carbon dioxide, and 0 to 5% methane. It also contains lesser amount of other gases. Syngas has less than half the energy density of natural gas.

The first reaction, between incandescent coke and steam, is strongly endothermic, producing carbon monoxide (CO) and hydrogen H_{2} (water gas in older terminology). When the coke bed has cooled to a temperature at which the endothermic reaction can no longer proceed, the steam is then replaced by a blast of air.

The second and third reactions then take place, producing an exothermic reaction—forming initially carbon dioxide and raising the temperature of the coke bed—followed by the second endothermic reaction, in which the latter is converted to carbon monoxide. The overall reaction is exothermic, forming "producer gas" (older terminology). Steam can then be re-injected, then air etc., to give an endless series of cycles until the coke is finally consumed. Producer gas has a much lower energy value, relative to water gas, due primarily to dilution with atmospheric nitrogen. Pure oxygen can be substituted for air to avoid the dilution effect, producing gas of much higher calorific value.

In order to produce more hydrogen from this mixture, more steam is added and the water gas shift reaction is carried out:

CO + H_{2}O → CO_{2} + H_{2}

The hydrogen can be separated from the CO_{2} by pressure swing adsorption (PSA), amine scrubbing, and membrane reactors. A variety of alternative technologies have been investigated, but none are of commercial value. Some variations focus on new stoichiometries such as carbon dioxide plus methane or partial hydrogenation of carbon dioxide. Other research focuses on novel energy sources to drive the processes including electrolysis, solar energy, microwaves, and electric arcs.

Electricity generated from renewable sources is also used to process carbon dioxide and water into syngas through high-temperature electrolysis. This is an attempt to maintain carbon neutrality in the generation process. Audi, in partnership with company named Sunfire, opened a pilot plant in November 2014 to generate e-diesel using this process.

Syngas that is not methanized typically has a lower heating value of 120 BTU/scf. Untreated syngas can be run in hybrid turbines that allow for greater efficiency because of their lower operating temperatures, and extended part lifetime.

== Uses ==
Syngas is used as a source of hydrogen as well as a fuel (see fuel cell). It is also used to directly reduce iron ore to sponge iron. Chemical uses include the production of methanol which is a precursor to acetic acid and many acetates; liquid fuels and lubricants via the Fischer–Tropsch process and previously the Mobil methanol to gasoline process; ammonia via the Haber process, which converts atmospheric nitrogen (N_{2}) into ammonia which is used as a fertilizer; and oxo alcohols via an intermediate aldehyde.

== Environmental impact ==
The environmental impact of syngas production depends on energy inputs, feedstocks, and processing methods used in production. Studies evaluating syngas environmental impacts include assessments of biogas based reforming systems. This examines how feedstock choice and process conditions influence emissions and overall system efficiency. Production methods that rely on fossil fuel based energy sources are generally associated with higher emissions. Comparing these with biomass or renewable electricity shows a higher emission number when compared. Reported outcomes depend on a number of factors such as land use, supply chain inputs, and system boundaries applied in analysis.

Lifecycle assessments of syngas production have also examined additional environmental indicators including energy demand, resource use and air pollutant emissions. Some studies highlight that upstream activities such as feedstock extraction and transportation can contribute to overall environmental burden. As a result the comparative sustainability of different syngas production systems often depend on tech configuration, regional energy mixes and system efficiency. These findings suggest that environmental performance can vary across all syngas systems but must be evaluated within specific production pathways.

== See also ==
- Boudouard reaction – Disproportionation of CO into CO2 and elemental carbon
- Claus process – Gas desulfurizing process
- Coal gas – Manufactured gaseous fuel
- Industrial gas – Gaseous materials produced for use in industry
- Integrated gasification combined cycle – Technology to turn coal into syngas
- Partial oxidation – Oxidation process stopping before full combustion
- Reformer sponge iron cycle – Chemical process
- Syngas fermentation
- Underground coal gasification – Conversion of coal to gas
