= Glossary of fuel cell terms =

The Glossary of fuel cell terms lists the definitions of many terms used within the fuel cell industry. The terms in this fuel cell glossary may be used by fuel cell industry associations, in education material and fuel cell codes and standards to name but a few.

== A ==
Activation loss
See overpotential.
Adsorption
Adsorption is a process that occurs when a gas or liquid solute accumulates on the surface of a solid or a liquid (adsorbent), forming a film of molecules or atoms (the adsorbate).
Alkali
In chemistry, an alkali is a basic, ionic salt of an alkali metal or alkaline earth metal element.
Alkali anion-exchange membrane
An alkali anion-exchange membrane (AAEM) is a semipermeable membrane generally made from ionomers and designed to conduct anions while being impermeable to gases such as oxygen or hydrogen.
Alkaline fuel cell
Alkaline fuel cell (AFC) also known as the Bacon fuel cell.
Alloy
An alloy is a solid solution or homogeneous mixture of two or more elements, at least one of which is a metal, which itself has metallic properties.
Alternator
An alternator is an electromechanical device that converts mechanical energy to alternating current electrical energy.
Alternating current
An alternating current (AC) is an electric current which reverses direction cyclically, as opposed to direct current, the direction of which remains constant.
Ambient air
The air surrounding a given object or system.
Ambient temperature
Ambient temperature is the temperature within enclosed space.
Ampere
The ampere, in practice often shortened to amp, (symbol: A) is a unit of electric current, or amount of electric charge per second.
Anion
A negatively charged ion; an ion that is attracted to the anode.
Anode
An anode is an electrode through which electric current flows into a polarized electrical device.
Aqueous phase reforming
APR is the production of hydrogen from biomass-derived oxygenated compounds (such as glycerol, sugars and sugar alcohols).
Artificial membrane
An artificial membrane, also called a synthetic membrane, is a membrane prepared for separation tasks in laboratory and industry.
Atmospheric pressure
Atmospheric pressure is the pressure at any given point in the Earth's atmosphere.
Atom
The atom is the smallest unit of an element that retains the chemical properties of that element. An atom has an electron cloud consisting of negatively charged electrons surrounding a dense nucleus. The nucleus contains positively charged protons and electrically neutral neutrons.
Autothermal reforming
Autothermal reforming (ATR) uses oxygen and carbon dioxide or steam in a reaction with methane to form syngas.
Auxiliary power unit
An auxiliary power unit (APU) is a device on a vehicle whose purpose is to provide energy for functions other than propulsion.
Availability factor
The availability factor of a power plant is the amount of time that it is able to produce electricity over a certain period, divided by the amount of the time in the period.

== B ==
Back pressure
Back pressure is the pressure exerted on a moving fluid by obstructions or tight bends in the confinement vessel along which it is moving, such as piping or air vents, against its direction of flow.
Baffle
A device or construction used to restrain or regulate, e.g. gas, or a fluid.
Balance of plant
Balance of plant (BOP) is the infrastructure of a fuel cell, not including the fuel cells. (See also Mechanical Balance of Plant MBOP and Electrical Balance of Plant EBOP).
Battery
In electronics, a battery is a combination of two or more electrochemical cells which store chemical energy and make it available as electrical energy.
Biofuel
Biofuel is defined as solid, liquid or gas fuel derived from recently dead biological material and is distinguished from fossil fuels, which are derived from long dead biological material.
Biogas
Biogas is a gas produced by the biological breakdown of organic matter in the absence of oxygen. Biogas originates from biogenic material and is a type of biofuel.
Bioreactor
A bioreactor is any device or system that supports a biologically active environment
Biosensor
A biosensor is a device for the detection of an analyte that combines a biological component with a physicochemical detector component.
Bipolar plate
A onductive plate in a fuel-cell stack that acts as an anode for one cell and a cathode for the adjacent cell. The plate may be made of metal or a conductive polymer (which may be a carbon-filled composite). The plate usually incorporates flow channels for the fluid feeds and may also contain conduits for heat transfer. See also MEA.
Black start
A black start is the process of restoring a power station to operation without relying on external energy sources.
Beta-alumina solid electrolyte
Beta-alumina solid electrolyte (BASE) is a fast ion conductor material used as a membrane in several types of molten salt electrochemical cell.
Boiling point
The boiling point of a liquid is the water temperature at which the vapor pressure of the liquid equals the environmental pressure surrounding the liquid.
Borax
Borax, also known as sodium borate, sodium tetraborate, or disodium tetraborate, is an important boron compound, a mineral, and a salt of boric acid.
British thermal unit
The mean British thermal unit (BTU) is 1/180 of the heat required to raise the temperature of one pound (450 g) of water from 32 to 212 °F (0 to 100 °C) at a constant atmospheric pressure. It is about equal to the quantity of heat required to raise one pound of water 1°F (5/9°C).
Busbar
In electrical power distribution, a busbar is the strips of copper or aluminium that conduct electricity within a switchboard, fuel cell, distribution board, substation, or other electrical apparatus.

== C ==
Capacity
Capacity is the ability to hold, receive or absorb, or a measure thereof, similar to the concept of volume.
Capacity factor
The net capacity factor of a power plant is the ratio of the actual output of a power plant over a period of time and its output if it had operated at full nameplate capacity the entire time.
Capital cost
Capital cost are costs incurred on the purchase of fuel cells, buildings, construction and equipment to be used in the use of fuel cells or the rendering of it.
Carbon
Carbon (C), an atom and primary constituent of hydrocarbon fuels. Carbon is routinely left as a black deposit on engine parts, such as pistons, rings, and valves, by the combustion of fuel.
Carbon black
Carbon black is a material produced by the incomplete combustion of heavy petroleum products such as FCC tar, coal tar, ethylene cracking tar, and a small amount from vegetable oil.
Carbon dioxide
Carbon dioxide (chemical formula: CO_{2}) is a chemical compound composed of two oxygen atoms covalently bonded to a single carbon atom.
Carbon dioxide sensor
A carbon dioxide sensor (CO_{2}) is an instrument for the measurement of carbon dioxide gas. The most common principles for CO_{2} sensors are infrared gas sensors (NDIR) and chemical gas sensors.
Carbon monoxide
Carbon monoxide, with the chemical formula CO, is a colorless, odorless, tasteless yet highly toxic gas.
Carbon monoxide detector
A carbon monoxide detector is a device that detects the presence of the toxic gas carbon monoxide (CO), a colorless and odorless compound produced by incomplete combustion and lethal at high levels.
Carbon paper
Carbon paper (originally carbonic paper) is paper coated on one side with a layer of a loosely bound dry ink or pigmented coating, usually bound with wax.
Carnot cycle
The Carnot cycle is a particular thermodynamic cycle, modeled on the hypothetical Carnot heat engine.
Catalysis
Catalysis is the process in which the rate of a chemical reaction is increased by means of a chemical substance known as a catalyst.
Catalyst
A catalyst is a chemical substance that increases the rate of a reaction without being consumed; after the reaction it can potentially be recovered from the reaction mixture chemically unchanged.
Catalyst poisoning
Catalyst poisoning is the effect that a catalyst can be 'poisoned' if it reacts with another compound that bonds chemically (similar to an inhibitor) but does not release, or chemically alters the catalyst.
Catalytic partial oxidation
In catalytic partial oxidation (CPOX) the use of a catalyst for partial oxidation reduces the required temperature to around 800–900 °C. The choice of reforming technique depends on the sulfur content of the fuel being used. CPOX can be employed if the sulfur content is below 50 ppm. A higher sulfur content would poison the catalyst, so the TPOX procedure is used for such fuels.
Cathode
A cathode is an electrode through which (positive) electric current flows out of a polarized electrical device.
Cation
A cation is a positively charged ion.
Celsius
The degree Celsius (°C) is a designation for specific temperatures on the Celsius scale as well as units of increment to indicate a temperature interval (a difference between two temperatures or an uncertainty).
Centimeter
A centimetre (American spelling: centimeter, symbol cm) is a unit of length in the metric system, equal to one hundredth of a metre, which is the current SI base unit of length.
Centrifugal governor
A centrifugal governor is a specific type of governor that controls the speed by regulating the amount of fuel (or working fluid) admitted, so as to maintain a near constant speed whatever the load or fuel supply conditions.
Ceramic
Ceramics are inorganic non-metallic materials formed by the action of heat.
Cermet
A cermet is a composite material composed of ceramic (cer) and metallic (met) materials.
Chemical thermodynamics
In thermodynamics, chemical thermodynamics is the mathematical study of the interrelation of heat and work with chemical reactions or with a physical change of state within the confines of the laws of thermodynamics.
Circuit
A circuit is a closed path formed by the interconnection of electronic components through which an electric current can flow.
Circuit diagram
A circuit diagram (also known as an electrical diagram, wiring diagram, elementary diagram, or electronic schematic) is a simplified conventional pictorial representation of an electrical circuit.
Circulation
In fluid dynamics, circulation is the line integral around a closed curve of the fluid velocity.
Climate change
Climate change is any long-term significant change in the “average weather” that a given region experiences.
Cogeneration
Cogeneration (also combined heat and power, CHP) is the use of a heat engine or a power station to simultaneously generate both electricity and useful heat.
Combustion
Combustion or burning is a complex sequence of exothermic chemical reactions between a fuel and an oxidant accompanied by the production of heat or both heat and light in the form of either a glow or flames.
Combustion chamber
A combustion chamber is the part of an engine in which fuel is burned.
Composite material
Composite materials (or composites for short) are engineered materials made from two or more constituent materials with significantly different physical or chemical properties and which remain separate and distinct on a macroscopic level within the finished structure.
Compressed hydrogen
Compressed hydrogen (CGH_{2}, CH2 or CH_{2}) is the gaseous state of the element hydrogen which is kept under pressure.
Compressed natural gas
Compressed Natural Gas (CNG) is a fossil fuel substitute for gasoline (petrol), diesel, or propane fuel.
Concentration
In chemistry, concentration is the measure of how much of a given substance there is mixed with other substances.
Condensate
Condensate, the liquid phase produced by the condensation of steam or any other gas
Condensation
Condensation is the change of the physical state of aggregation (or simply state) of matter from gaseous phase into liquid phase.
Condenser
In systems involving heat transfer, a condenser is a heat exchanger which condenses a substance from its gaseous to its liquid state.
Contamination
Contamination is the introduction of material that "does not belong there".
Coulomb
The coulomb (symbol: C) is the SI unit of electric charge.
Countercurrent exchange
Countercurrent exchange is a mechanism used to transfer some property of a fluid from one flowing current of fluid to another across a semipermeable membrane, conductive material, or free surface (e.g. a liquid–gas absorption or extraction).
Cryogenic liquefaction
Cryogenic liquification is the process through which gases such as nitrogen, hydrogen, helium, and natural gas are liquefied under pressure at very low temperatures.
Current
See electric current.
Current collector
The current collector is the conductive material in a fuel cell that collects electrons (on the anode side) or disburses electrons (on the cathode side). Current collectors are microporous (to allow for fluid flow through them) and lie in between the catalyst/electrolyte surfaces and the bipolar plates.

== D ==
DC-to-DC converter
In electronic engineering, a DC-to-DC converter is a circuit which converts a source of direct current (DC) from one voltage level to another. It is a class of power converter.
Density
The density of a material is defined as its mass per unit volume
Desiccant
A desiccant is a hygroscopic substance that induces or sustains a state of dryness (desiccation) in its local vicinity in a moderately-well sealed container.
Detection limit
In analytical chemistry, the detection limit, lower limit of detection, or LOD (limit of detection), is the lowest quantity of a substance that can be distinguished from the absence of that substance (a blank value) within a stated confidence limit (generally 1%).
Dew point
The dew point (sometimes spelled dewpoint) is the temperature to which a given parcel of air must be cooled, at constant barometric pressure, for water vapor to condense into water.
Diffusion
Diffusion is part of transport phenomena. Diffusion is the movement of molecules from a region of higher concentration to one of lower concentration by random molecular motion.
Direct borohydride fuel cell
Direct borohydride fuel cell (DBFC) a subcategory of alkaline fuel cells
Direct carbon fuel cell
Direct carbon fuel cell (DCFC), a fuel cell that uses a carbonaceous material as a fuel.
Direct current
Direct current (DC) is the unidirectional flow of electric charge.
Direct-ethanol fuel cell
Direct-ethanol fuel cell (DEFC) a subcategory of proton-exchange fuel cells where, the fuel, ethanol, is not reformed, but fed directly to the fuel cell.
Direct methanol fuel cell
Direct methanol fuel cell (DMFC) subcategory of proton-exchange fuel cells where the methanol (CH_{3}OH) fuel is not reformed as in the indirect methanol fuel cell, but fed directly to the fuel cell
Dispersion
Dispersion, in fluid dynamics is dispersive mass transfer, which is the spreading of mass from areas of high to low concentration
Distributed Generation
Distributed generation, also called on-site generation, dispersed generation, embedded generation, decentralized generation, decentralized energy or distributed energy, generates electricity from many small energy sources.
Doping
In semiconductor production, doping is the process of intentionally introducing impurities into an extremely pure (also referred to as intrinsic) semiconductor in order to change its electrical properties.
Downtime
Downtime or outage is a period of time or a percentage of a timespan that a system is unavailable or offline.
Dry basis
It is customary to report the product composition data in steam reforming reactions on a steam free basis (dry basis) since the steam is not a constituent in any of the synthesis gases produced or in the reformed gas when used as a fuel; however, if steam is to be considered in the product composition data as well, then the calculation would be wet basis.

== E ==
Effluent
Effluent is an outflowing of water from a natural body of water, or from a man-made structure.
Electrical balance of plant
Electrical balance of plant (EBOP), the user interface panel, control equipment, and converting the fuel cell DC power to AC power.
Electricity
Electricity is any phenomenon resulting from the presence and flow of electric charge.
Electrical conductivity
Electrical conductivity or specific conductivity is a measure of a material's ability to conduct an electric current.
Electrical efficiency
The electrical efficiency of an entity (a device, component, or system) in electronics and electrical engineering is defined as useful power output divided by the total electrical power consumed (a fractional expression), typically denoted by the Greek letter small eta (η).
Electrical insulation
An electrical insulator is a material that resists the flow of electric current. It is an object intended to support or separate electrical conductors without passing current through itself.
Electrical resistance
Electrical resistance is a ratio of the degree to which an object opposes an electric current through it, measured in ohms.
Electric circuit
An electrical circuit is a network that has a closed loop, giving a return path for the current. A network is a connection of two or more components, and may not necessarily be a circuit.
Electric current
Electric current is the flow (movement) of electric charge. The SI unit of electric current is the ampere.
Electricity generation
Electricity generation is the process of converting non-electrical energy to electricity.
Electric power conversion
In electrical engineering, power conversion has a more specific meaning, namely converting electric power from one form to another.
Electrochemistry
Electrochemistry is a branch of chemistry that studies chemical reactions which take place in a solution at the interface of an electron conductor (a metal or a semiconductor) and an ionic conductor (the electrolyte), and which involve electron transfer between the electrode and the electrolyte or species in solution.
Electrochemical cell
An electrochemical cell is a device used for generating an electromotive force (voltage) and current from chemical reactions.
Electrochemical gas sensor
Electrochemical gas sensors are gas detectors that measure the volume of a target gas by oxidizing or reducing the target gas at an electrode and measuring the resulting current.
Electrode
An electrode is an electrical conductor used to make contact with a nonmetallic part of a circuit (e.g. a semiconductor, an electrolyte or a vacuum).
Electro-galvanic fuel cell
Electro-galvanic fuel cell (EGFC) is an electrical device used to measure the concentration of oxygen gas in scuba diving and medical equipment.
Electroosmotic flow
Electroosmotic flow (or electro-osmotic flow, often abbreviated EOF) is the motion of liquid induced by an applied potential across a capillary tube or microchannel. Electroosmotic flow is an essential component in chemical separation techniques, notably capillary electrophoresis.
Electroosmotic pump
An electroosmotic pump (EOP), or EO pump, is used for removing liquid flooding water from channels and gas diffusion layers and direct hydration of the proton-exchange membrane in the membrane electrode assembly (MEA) of the proton-exchange membrane fuel cell
Electrolysis
In chemistry and manufacturing, electrolysis is a method of separating chemically bonded elements and compounds by passing an electric current through them.
Electrolyte
An electrolyte is any substance containing free ions that behaves as an electrically conductive medium.
Electron
The electron is a fundamental subatomic particle that carries a negative electric charge.
Emission
Emission of air pollutants.
Emission standard
Emission standards are requirements that set specific limits to the amount of pollutants that can be released into the environment.
Endothermic
In thermodynamics, the endothermic processes or reactions are those that absorb energy in the form of heat.
Energy
In physics and other sciences, energy is a scalar physical quantity that is a property of objects and systems which is conserved by nature. Energy is often defined as the ability to do work.
Energy carrier
An energy carrier is a substance or phenomenon that can be used to produce mechanical work or heat or to operate chemical or physical processes (ISO 13600).
Energy content
Amount of energy for a given weight of fuel. see also energy density
Energy security
Energy security
Energy storage
Energy storage is the storing of some form of energy that can be drawn upon at a later time to perform some useful operation.
Engine
An engine is a machine that converts heat energy into mechanical energy.
Energy conversion efficiency
Energy conversion efficiency is the ratio between the useful output of an energy conversion machine and the input, in energy terms.
Energy density
Energy density is the amount of energy stored in a given system or region of space per unit volume, or per unit mass, depending on the context, although the latter is more formally specific energy
Energy transformation
In physics and engineering, energy transformation or energy conversion, is any process of transforming one form of energy to another.
Enthalpy
In thermodynamics and molecular chemistry, the enthalpy or heat content (denoted as H, h, or rarely as χ) is a quotient or description of thermodynamic potential of a system that can be used to calculate the "useful" work obtainable from a closed thermodynamic system under constant pressure and entropy.
Enthalpy of vaporization
The enthalpy of vaporization, (symbol $\Delta_\text{v} H$), also known as the heat of vaporization or heat of evaporation, is the energy required to transform a given quantity of a substance into a gas.
Ethanol
Ethanol, also called ethyl alcohol, grain alcohol, or drinking alcohol, is a volatile, flammable, colorless liquid.
Evaporation
Evaporation is the process by which molecules in a liquid state (e.g. water) spontaneously become gaseous (e.g. water vapor).
Exergy
In thermodynamics, the exergy of a system is the maximum work possible during a process that brings the system into equilibrium with a heat reservoir.
Exergy efficiency
Exergy efficiency (also known as the second-law efficiency or rational efficiency) computes the efficiency of a process taking the second law of thermodynamics into account.
Exhaust gas
Exhaust gas is flue gas which occurs as a result of the combustion of fuels such as natural gas, gasoline/petrol, diesel, fuel oil or coal. It is discharged into the atmosphere through an exhaust pipe or flue gas stack.
Exothermic
In thermodynamics, exothermic processes or reactions are those that release energy, usually in the form of heat but also in the form of light (e.g. explosions), sound, or electricity.
Expansion ratio
Expansion ratio is used in the context of liquefied and cryogenic substances. The expansion ratio of a substance is the volume of a given amount of that substance in liquid form compared to the volume of the same amount of substance in gaseous form, at a given temperature.

== F ==
Fan
A mechanical fan is an electrically powered device used to produce an airflow for the purpose of creature comfort (particularly in the heat), ventilation, exhaust, or any other gaseous transport.
Fahrenheit
Fahrenheit is a temperature scale. In this scale, the freezing point of water is 32 degrees Fahrenheit (°F) and the boiling point 212 °F
Failure mode and effects analysis
A failure mode and effects analysis (FMEA) is a procedure for analysis of potential failure modes within a system for classification by severity or determination of the effect of failures on the system.
FCEV
A fuel cell electric vehicle is a fuel cell vehicle that has a battery it can charge from an external source as well as from its on-board fuel cell.
FCV
Fuel cell vehicle
Feedstock purification
Feedstock purification, The process of removing poisons like sulfur (S) and chloride (Cl) from the feedstock.
Flammability
Flammability is the ease with which a substance will ignite, causing fire or combustion.
Flammability limit
Flammability limits, also called flammable limits, give the proportion of combustible gases in a mixture, between which limits this mixture is flammable.
Flash point
The flash point of a flammable liquid is the lowest temperature at which it can form an ignitable mixture in air.
Float valve
A float valve is a mechanical feedback mechanism that regulates fluid level by using a float to drive an inlet valve so that a higher fluid level will force the valve closed while a lower fluid level will force the valve open.
Flow battery
Flow battery (FB) a form of rechargeable battery in which electrolyte containing one or more dissolved electroactive species flows through a power cell / reactor that converts chemical energy to electricity.
Flow measurement
Flow measurement is the quantification of bulk fluid movement. It can be measured in a variety of ways.
Flue gas
Flue gas is gas that exits to the atmosphere via a flue.
Flue-gas desulfurization
Flue-gas desulfurization (FGD) is the technology used for removing sulfur dioxide (SO_{2}) from the exhaust flue gases.
Fluid dynamics
Fluid dynamics is the sub-discipline of fluid mechanics dealing with fluid flow: fluids (liquids and gases) in motion.
Fluid mechanics
Fluid mechanics is the study of how fluids move and the forces on them. (Fluids include liquids and gases.) Fluid mechanics can be divided into fluid statics, the study of fluids at rest, and fluid dynamics, the study of fluids in motion.
Flux
In the study of transport phenomena (heat transfer, mass transfer and fluid dynamics), flux is defined as the amount that flows through a unit area per unit time.
Formic acid
Formic acid (systematically called methanoic acid) is the simplest carboxylic acid. Its formula is HCOOH or CH_{2}O_{2}.
Formic acid fuel cell
Formic acid fuel cell (DFAFC), a subcategory of proton-exchange fuel cells where, the fuel, formic acid, is not reformed, but fed directly to the fuel cell.
Fossil fuel
Fossil fuels or mineral fuels are fossil source fuels, that is, hydrocarbons found within the top layer of the Earth’s crust.
Fouling
Fouling is the accumulation of unwanted material on solid surfaces,
Frequency changer
A frequency changer or frequency converter is an electronic device that converts alternating current (AC) of one frequency to alternating current of another frequency.
Fuel
Fuel is any material that is burned or altered in order to obtain energy.
Fuel cell
A fuel cell (FC) is an electrochemical conversion device.
Fuel cell poisoning
The lowering of a fuel cell's efficiency due to impurities in the fuel binding to the catalyst. See catalyst poisoning.
Fuel cell vehicle
A fuel cell vehicle is any vehicle that uses a fuel cell to produce its on-board motive power.
Fuel efficiency
Fuel efficiency, in its basic sense, is the same as thermal efficiency, meaning the efficiency of a process that converts chemical potential energy contained in a carrier fuel into kinetic energy or work.
Fuel efficiency in transportation
Fuel efficiency in transportation
Fuel processor
Device used to generate hydrogen from fuels such as natural gas, propane, gasoline, methanol, and ethanol, for use in fuel cells.
Fuel processing system
Fuel processing system (FPS)
Fuel pump
Fuel pump
Fusible plug
A fusible plug is a threaded metal plug, usually made out of bronze, brass, or gunmetal.

== G ==
Gadolinium doped ceria
Gadolinium doped ceria (GDC) – (for SOFC)
Gas
Fuel gas, such as natural gas, undiluted liquefied petroleum gases (vapor phase only), liquefied petroleum gas–air mixtures, or mixtures of these gases.
- Liquefied petroleum gases (LPG) as used in this standard, shall mean and include any material which is composed predominantly of any of the following hydrocarbons, or mixtures of them: propane, propylene, butanes (normal butane or isobutane) and butylenes.
- LP gas–air mixture – liquefied petroleum gases distributed at relatively low pressures and normal atmospheric temperatures which have been diluted with air to produce desired heating value and utilization characteristics.
- Natural gas – mixtures of hydrocarbon gases and vapors consisting principally of methane (CH4) in gaseous form.
Gas compressor
A gas compressor is a mechanical device that increases the pressure of a gas by reducing its volume.
Gas detector
A gas detector is a device which detects the presence of various gases within an area, usually as part of a system to warn about gases which might be harmful to humans or animals.
Gas diffusion
Mixing of two gases caused by random molecular motions. Gases diffuse very quickly; liquids diffuse much more slowly, and solids diffuse at very slow (but often measurable) rates. Molecular collisions make diffusion slower in liquids and solids.
Gas diffusion electrode
Gas diffusion electrodes are electrodes with a conjunction of a solid, liquid and gaseous interface, and an electrical conducting catalyst supporting an electrochemical reaction between the liquid and the gaseous phase.
Gasification
Gasification is a process that converts carbonaceous materials, such as coal, petroleum, or biomass, into carbon monoxide and hydrogen by reacting the raw material at high temperatures with a controlled amount of oxygen and/or steam.
Gasoline gallon equivalent
Gasoline gallon equivalent (GGE) or gasoline-equivalent gallon (GEG) is the amount of alternative fuel it takes to equal the energy content of one liquid gallon of gasoline.
Gibbs free energy
In thermodynamics, the Gibbs free energy (IUPAC recommended name: Gibbs energy or Gibbs function) is a thermodynamic potential which measures the "useful" or process-initiating work obtainable from an isothermal, isobaric thermodynamic system.
Graphite
The mineral graphite, as with diamond and fullerene, is one of the allotropes of carbon.
Greenhouse effect
Gases in the Earth's atmosphere that contribute to the greenhouse effect, effectively absorbing thermal infrared radiation, emitted by the Earth’s surface
Greenhouse gases
Warming of the Earth's atmosphere due to greenhouse gases in the atmosphere that allow solar radiation (visible, ultraviolet) to reach the Earth's atmosphere but do not allow the emitted infrared radiation to pass back out of the Earth's atmosphere.
Grid connection
Grid connection
Grid-tied electrical system
A grid-tied electrical system, also called Tied to grid or Grid tie system, is a semi-autonomous electrical generation or grid energy storage system which links to the mains to feed excess capacity back to the local mains electrical grid.
Grid tie inverter
Grid tie inverter
Guard bed
Guard bed, see guard catalyst bed and liquid-phase guard bed.
Guard catalyst bed
A guard catalyst bed is a fixed bed of pellets of the same catalytic material, see fixed bed reactor.

== H ==
Half-reaction
A half reaction is either the oxidation or reduction reaction component of a redox reaction.
Heat exchanger
A heat exchanger is a device built for efficient heat transfer from one medium to another, whether the media are separated by a solid wall so that they never mix, or the media are in direct contact.
Heat pipe
A heat pipe is a heat transfer mechanism that can transport large quantities of heat with a very small difference in temperature between the hotter and colder interfaces.
Heat transfer
In thermal physics, heat transfer is the passage of thermal energy from a hot to a colder body.
Heating value
The heating value (total) (ΔH_{c}^{0}) is the energy released as heat when a compound undergoes complete combustion with oxygen. See also Higher heating value (HHV) and Lower heating value) (LHV).
Heat of combustion
The heat of combustion (ΔH_{c}^{0}) is the energy released as heat when a compound undergoes complete combustion with oxygen. The chemical reaction is typically a hydrocarbon reacting with oxygen to form carbon dioxide, water and heat.
Higher heating value
The higher heating value (HHV) (also known as the gross calorific value or gross energy) of a fuel is defined as the amount of heat released by a specified quantity (initially at 25 °C) once it is combusted and the products have returned to a temperature of 25 °C.
High-temperature shift
High-temperature shift (HTS), the water gas shift reaction at 350 °C (662 °F) in the presence of a metal-based catalyst (nickel)
Hybrid electric vehicle
A hybrid electric vehicle (HEV) is a hybrid vehicle which combines a conventional propulsion system with a rechargeable energy storage system (RESS) to achieve better fuel economy than a conventional vehicle.
Hydride
Hydride is the name given to the negative ion of hydrogen, H^{−}.
Hydride ion
Aside from electride, the hydride ion is the simplest possible anion, consisting of two electrons and a proton. See also hydrogen anion
Hydrocarbon
In organic chemistry, a hydrocarbon (HC) is an organic compound consisting entirely of hydrogen and carbon.
Hydrocarbon dew point
The hydrocarbon dew point (HDP) or (HCDP) is the temperature (at a given pressure) at which the hydrocarbon components of any hydrocarbon-rich gas mixture, such as natural gas, will start to condense out of the gaseous phase.
Hydrodesulfurization
Hydrodesulfurization (HDS) is a catalytic chemical process widely used to remove sulfur (S) from natural gas and from refined petroleum products such as gasoline or petrol, jet fuel, kerosene, diesel fuel, and fuel oils.
Hydrogen
Hydrogen is the chemical element with atomic number 1. It is represented by the symbol H. At standard temperature and pressure, hydrogen is a colorless, odorless, nonmetallic, tasteless, highly flammable diatomic gas with the molecular formula H_{2}.
Hydrogen anion
The hydrogen anion is a negative hydrogen ion, H^{−}. See also hydride ion.
Hydrogen purity
Hydrogen purity or hydrogen quality is the lack of impurities in hydrogen as a fuel gas.
Hydrogen-rich fuel
A fuel that contains a significant amount of hydrogen, such as gasoline, diesel fuel, methanol (CH3OH), ethanol (CH3CH2OH), natural gas, and coal.
Hydrogen sulfide sensor
A hydrogen sulfide sensor or H_{2}S sensor is a gas sensor for the measurement of hydrogen sulfide in a gas stream.

== I ==
Impurity
Impurities are substances inside a confined amount of liquid, gas, or solid, which differ from the chemical composition of the material or compound.
Influent
Influent
Interlock
Interlocking is a method of preventing undesired states in a state machine, which in a general sense can include any electrical, electronic, or mechanical device or system.
Internal combustion engine
An internal combustion engine (ICE) is an engine in which the combustion of fuel and an oxidizer (typically air) occurs in a confined space called a combustion chamber.
Inverter
An inverter is an electrical or electro-mechanical device that converts direct current (DC) to alternating current (AC)
Ion
An ion is an atom or molecule which has lost or gained one or more valence electrons, giving it a positive or negative electrical charge.
Ion exchange
Ion exchange is an exchange of ions between two electrolytes or between an electrolyte solution and a complex.
Ion-exchange resin
An ion-exchange resin is an insoluble matrix (or support structure) normally in the form of small (1–2 mm diameter) beads, usually white or yellowish, fabricated from an organic polymer substrate.
Ionomer
An ionomer is a polyelectrolyte that comprises copolymers containing both electrically neutral repeating units and a fraction of ionized units
Islanding
Islanding is the condition of a distributed generation (DG) generator continuing to power a location even though power from the electric utility is no longer present.

== K ==
Kröger–Vink notation
Kröger–Vink notation is set of conventions used to describe electrical charge and lattice position for point defect species in crystals.
Kilogram
The kilogram or kilogramme (symbol: kg) is the base unit of mass in the International System of Units (known also by its French-language initials “SI”). The kilogram is almost exactly equal to the mass of one liter of water.
Kilowatt
The kilowatt (symbol: kW), equal to one thousand watts, is typically used to state the power output of engines and the power consumption of tools and machines.
Kilowatt hour
The kilowatt hour, also written kilowatt-hour (symbol kW·h, kW h or kWh) is a unit of energy.

== L ==
Landfill gas
landfill gas (LFG), see biogas.
Lanthanum carbonate
Lanthanum carbonate is used as a lanthanum source for solid-state production of lanthanum strontium manganite (LSM), primarily for solid oxide fuel cell applications.
LH_{2}
See liquid hydrogen.
Life-cycle assessment
A life-cycle assessment (LCA, also known as life-cycle analysis, ecobalance, and cradle-to-grave analysis) is the investigation and valuation of the environmental impacts of a given product or service caused or necessitated by its existence.
Linear regulator
In electronics, a linear regulator is a voltage regulator based on an active device (such as a bipolar junction transistor, field effect transistor or vacuum tube) operating in its "linear region"
Liquid
liquid is one of the principal states of matter.
Liquid hydrogen
Liquid hydrogen (LH2 or LH_{2}) is the liquid state of the element hydrogen.
Liquid–liquid extraction
Liquid–liquid extraction, also known as solvent extraction and partitioning, is a method to separate compounds based on their relative solubilities in two different immiscible liquids, usually water and an organic solvent.
Liquefied natural gas
Liquefied natural gas (LNG) is natural gas (primarily methane, CH_{4}) that has been converted to liquid form for ease of storage or transport.
Liquefied petroleum gas
Liquefied petroleum gas (also called LPG, GPL, LP gas, or autogas) is a mixture of hydrocarbon gases used as a fuel in heating appliances and vehicles
Liquefaction
In physics, to liquefy (sometimes spelled as "liquify") means to turn something into the liquid state.
Liquefaction of gases
Liquefaction of gases includes a number of phases used to convert a gas into a liquid state.
List of chemical purification methods in chemistry
Purification in a chemical context is the physical separation of a chemical substance of interest from foreign or contaminating substances. The following list of chemical purification methods should not be considered exhaustive.
Load following power plant
A load following power plant is a power plant that adjusts its power output as demand for electricity fluctuates throughout the day.
Load profile
In electrical engineering, a load profile is a graph of the variation in the electrical load versus time.
Lower flammability limit
Lower flammability limit (LFL), usually expressed in volume per cent, is the lower end of the concentration range of a flammable solvent at a given temperature and pressure for which air/vapor mixtures can ignite.
Lower heating value
The lower heating value (also known as net calorific value, net CV, or LHV) of a fuel is defined as the amount of heat released by combusting a specified quantity (initially at 25 °C or another reference state) and returning the temperature of the combustion products to 150 °C.
Low temperature shift
Low temperature shift (LTS), the water gas shift reaction at 190–210 °C (374–410 °F) in the presence of a metal-based catalyst (nickel).

== M ==
Maintenance, repair and operation cost
Maintenance, repair and operation cost or maintenance, repair and overhaul (MRO) is fixing any sort of mechanical or electrical device should it become out of order or broken (repair) as well as performing the routine actions which keep the device in working order (maintenance) or prevent trouble from arising (preventive maintenance).
Mass flow sensor
A mass flow sensor (MAF) responds to the amount of a fluid (usually a gas) flowing through a chamber containing the sensor.
Maximum allowable operating pressure
Maximum allowable operating pressure (MAOP) is the wall strength of a pressurized cylinder such as a pipeline or storage tank and how much pressure the walls may safely hold before rupturing.
Mean down time
In organizational management, mean down time (MDT) is the average time that a system is non-operational.
Mean time between failures
Mean time between failures (MTBF) is the mean (average) time between failures of a system, and is often attributed to the "useful life" of the device i.e. not including "infant mortality" or "end of life" if the device is not repairable.
Mean time between outages
In a system the mean time between outages (MTBO) is the mean time between equipment failures that result in loss of system continuity or unacceptable degradation.
Mechanical energy
In physics, mechanical energy is the potential energy and kinetic energy present in the components of a mechanical system.
Mechanical balance of plant
Mechanical balance of plant (MBOP), the process equipment needed to provide steam, gas, and air to the fuel cell stack.
Membrane
See semipermeable membrane and artificial membrane
Membrane electrode assembly
Membrane electrode assembly (MEA) is an assembled stack of proton-exchange membranes.
Megawatt
The megawatt (symbol: MW) is equal to one million (1000000) watts.
Meter
Meter (m), basic metric unit of length equal to 3.28 feet, 1.09 yards or 39.37 inches. Related units are the decimeter (dm) at 10 per meter, the centimeter (cm) at 100 per meter, the millimeter (mm) at 1000 per meter and the kilometer (km) at 1000 meters.
Methanation
Methanation is a physical-chemical process to generate Methane from a mixture of various gases out of biomass fermentation or thermo-chemical gasification.
Methane
Methane is a chemical compound with the molecular formula CH_{4}. It is the simplest alkane, and the principal component of natural gas.
Methane reformer
A methane reformer is a device used in chemical engineering, which can produce pure hydrogen gas from natural gas using a catalyst. (See ATR and SMR).
Methanol
Methanol, also known as methyl alcohol, carbinol, wood alcohol, wood naphtha or wood spirits, is a chemical compound with chemical formula CH_{3}OH (often abbreviated MeOH).
Methanol reformer
A methanol reformer is a device used in chemical engineering, especially in the area of fuel cell technology, which can produce pure hydrogen gas and carbon dioxide by reacting a methanol and water (steam) mixture.
MicroCHP
"Micro cogeneration" or micro combined heat and power (mCHP) is a so called distributed energy resource (DER).
Microbial fuel cell
Microbial fuel cell (MFC) or biological fuel cell is a bio-electrochemical system that drives a current by mimicking bacterial interactions found in nature.
Micropump
A micropump is a small pump, particularly one with functional dimensions in the micrometre range.
Miles per gallon equivalent
Miles per gallon of gasoline equivalent (MPGe) is a unit of measurement that relates efficiencies of different systems to the traditional unit of measurement for fuel efficiency (miles per gallon of gasoline).
Millimeter
Millimeter (mm), metric unit of length, equal to about 0.04 inch (there are 25.4 mm in an inch). There are 1000 millimeters in a meter.
Milliwatt
Milliwatt (mW), a unit of power equal to one-thousandth of a watt.
Molten-carbonate fuel cells
Molten-carbonate fuel cells (MCFCs) are high-temperature fuel cells

== N ==
Nafion
Nafion is a sulfonated tetrafluoroethylene copolymer.
Nano iron powder
Nano iron powder is an iron powder with granules' sizes ranging on the nanoscale.
Nanowire
A nanowire is a wire of diameter of the order of a nanometer (10^{−9} meters).
Natural gas
Natural gas is a gaseous fossil fuel consisting primarily of methane but including significant quantities of ethane, propane, butane, and pentane—heavier hydrocarbons removed prior to use as a consumer fuel, as well as carbon dioxide, nitrogen, helium and hydrogen sulfide.
Nernst equation
In electrochemistry, the Nernst equation is an equation which can be used (in conjunction with other information) to determine the equilibrium reduction potential of a half-cell in an electrochemical cell.
Net energy gain
In energy economics, net energy gain (NEG) is a surplus condition in the difference between the energy required to harvest an energy source and the energy provided by that same source.
Nickel
Nickel is a metallic chemical element with the symbol Ni and atomic number 28.
Nitrogen
Nitrogen N_{2} a chemical element that has the symbol N and atomic number 7 and atomic weight 14.0067. Molecular nitrogen (N_{2}) is a colorless, odorless, tasteless and mostly inert diatomic gas at standard conditions, constituting 78.08% by volume of Earth's atmosphere.
Nitrogen oxide
Nitrogen oxide (NO_{x}) is any binary compound of oxygen and nitrogen or a mixture of such compounds
Nitrogen oxide sensor
A nitrogen oxide sensor or NO_{x} sensor is typically a high-temperature device built to detect nitrogen oxides in combustion environments such as an automobile or truck tailpipe or a smokestack.

== O ==
Off-board reforming
Off-board reforming, stationary reforming, see steam reforming, methane reformer, methanol reformer
Ohm
The ohm (symbol: Ω) is the SI unit of electrical impedance or, in the direct current case, electrical resistance, named after Georg Ohm.
Onboard reforming
On-board reforming, reforming on board a vehicle, see steam reforming, methane reformer, methanol reformer
Open-circuit voltage
Open-circuit voltage or OCV is the difference of electrical potential between two terminals of a device when there is no external load connected, i.e. the circuit is broken or open.
Original equipment manufacturer
An original equipment manufacturer, or OEM is typically a company that uses a component made by a second company in its own product, or sells the product of the second company under its own brand.
Output impedance
Output impedance is the equivalent in-series impedance for a linear electronic circuit or device modelled as an ideal voltage source. This is helpful in analysing the voltage drop which occurs as current is drawn.
Overpotential
In electrochemistry, overpotential is the difference in the electric potential of an electrode with no current through it, at equilibrium, and with a current.
Overpressure
Overpressure.
Overvoltage
When the voltage in a circuit or part of it is raised above its upper design limit, this is known as overvoltage.
Oxidant
An oxidizing agent (also called an oxidant or oxidizer) can be defined as either: a chemical compound that readily transfers oxygen atoms, or a substance that gains electrons in a redox chemical reaction. In both cases, the oxidizing agent becomes reduced in the process.
Oxidation
See redox.
Oxygen
Oxygen is the element with atomic number 8 and represented by the symbol O.
Oxygen sensor
An oxygen sensor, or lambda sensor, is an electronic device that measures the proportion of oxygen (O_{2}) in the gas or liquid being analyzed.

== P ==
Palladium
Palladium is a rare and lustrous silvery-white metal with the symbol Pd, and its atomic number is 46.
Parallel circuit
Parallel circuit, if two or more components are connected in parallel they have the same potential difference (voltage) across their ends. The potential differences across the components are the same in magnitude, and they also have identical polarities. Hence, the same voltage is applicable to all circuit components connected in parallel.
Partial oxidation
In chemistry, a partial oxidation (POX) reaction occurs when a substoichiometric fuel-air mixture is partially combusted in a reformer.
Partial pressure
In a mixture of ideal gases, each gas has a partial pressure which is the pressure which the gas would have if it alone occupied the volume. The total pressure of a gas mixture is the sum of the partial pressures of each individual gas in the mixture.
Particulate
Particulates, alternatively referred to as particulate matter (PM) or fine particles, are tiny particles of solid or liquid suspended in a gas.
Parts per million
Parts per million (ppm) denotes the amount of a given substance in a total amount of 1000000 regardless of the units of measure used as long as they are the same. e.g. 1 milligram per kilogram. 1 part in 10^{6}.
Parts per million by volume
In atmospheric chemistry and in air pollution regulations, the parts per notation is commonly expressed with a "v" following, such as ppmv, to indicate parts per million by volume.
Pascal
The pascal (symbol: Pa) is the SI derived unit of pressure, stress, Young's modulus and tensile strength. It is a measure of perpendicular force per unit area i.e. equivalent to one newton per square meter or one joule per cubic metre.
Peak load
Peak load.
PEDOT
Poly(3,4-ethylenedioxythiophene) or PEDOT (or sometimes PEDT) is a conducting polymer based on 3,4-ethylenedioxylthiophene or EDOT monomer.
Permeation
Permeation, in physics and engineering, is the penetration of a permeate (such as a liquid, gas, or vapor) through a solid, and is related to a material's intrinsic permeability. Permeability is tested by permeation measurement.
Phase transition
In thermodynamics, phase transition or phase change is the transformation of a thermodynamic system from one phase to another.
Phosphoric acid
Phosphoric acid, also known as orthophosphoric acid or phosphoric(V) acid, is a mineral (inorganic) acid having the chemical formula H_{3}PO_{4}.
Phosphoric acid fuel cell
Phosphoric acid fuel cell (PAFC), a type of fuel cell that uses liquid phosphoric acid as an electrolyte.
Photoelectrochemical cell
Photoelectrochemical cell (PEC), a solar cell that extracts electrical energy from light, including visible light.
Platinum
Platinum is a chemical element with the atomic symbol Pt.
Polybenzimidazole fiber
Polybenzimidazole (PBI) fiber (1983) is a synthetic fiber with an extremely high melting point that also does not ignite.
Polyethylene
Polyethylene or polythene (IUPAC name poly(ethene)) is a thermoplastic commodity
Polymer
A polymer is a large molecule (macromolecule) composed of repeating structural units connected by covalent chemical bonds. See also plastic.
Polymer electrolyte membrane
A polymer electrolyte membrane (PEM), is a fuel cell incorporating a solid polymer membrane used as its electrolyte. Protons (H^{+}) are transported from the anode to the cathode. The operating temperature range is generally 60–100 °C.
Polytetrafluoroethylene
In chemistry, poly(tetrafluoroethene) or poly(tetrafluoroethylene) (PTFE) is a synthetic fluoropolymer which finds numerous applications.
Polymer electrolyte membrane fuel cell
Polymer electrolyte membrane fuel cell (PEMFC or PEFC), a type of acid-based fuel cell in which the transport of protons (H^{+}) from the anode to the cathode is through a solid, aqueous membrane impregnated with an appropriate acid. The electrolyte is a called a polymer electrolyte membrane (PEM). The fuel cells typically run at low temperatures (<100 °C).
Potential difference
In physics, the potential difference or p.d. between two points is the difference of the points' scalar potential, equivalent to the line integral of the field strength between the two points.
Portable fuel cell applications
Portable fuel cell applications (or portable fuel cell power systems) are portable (movable) fuel cell applications
Potassium hydroxide
Potassium hydroxide is the inorganic compound with the formula KOH.
Power
In physics, power (symbol: P) is the rate at which work is performed or energy is transmitted, or the amount of energy required or expended for a given unit of time.
Power density
Power density (P^{v}), see specific power.
Power factor
The power factor of an AC electric power system is defined as the ratio of the real power to the apparent power, and is a number between 0 and 1 (frequently expressed as a percentage, e.g. 0.5 pf = 50% pf).
Power supply
Power supply is a source of electrical power.
Power-to-weight ratio
Power-to-weight ratio (specific power) is a calculation commonly applied to engines and other mobile power sources to enable the comparison of one unit or design to another.
Power per unit of mass
Power per unit of mass is the power-to-weight ratio, measured in kilowatts per kilogram (generally, kW/kg).
Preferential oxidation
Preferential oxidation (PROX) is the preferential oxidation of a gas on a catalyst.
Pressure regulator
A pressure regulator is a valve that automatically cuts off the flow of a liquid or gas at a certain pressure.
Pressure relief valve
A pressure relief valve (PRV), also called a pressure safety valve (PSV), is a safety device that relieves in case of overpressure in vessel or piping.
Pressure sensor
A pressure sensor measures the pressure, typically of gases or liquids.
Pressure swing adsorption
Pressure swing adsorption (PSA) is a technology used to separate some gas species from a mixture of gases under pressure according to the species' molecular characteristics and affinity for an adsorbent material.
Pressure vessel
A pressure vessel is a closed container designed to hold gases or liquids at a pressure different from the ambient pressure.
Propane
Propane is a three-carbon alkane, normally a gas, but compressible to a liquid that is transportable. See also LPG.
Proton
The proton is a subatomic particle with an electric charge of one positive fundamental unit
Proton-exchange membrane
Proton-exchange membrane (PEM) is a semipermeable membrane generally made from ionomers and designed to conduct protons while being impermeable to gases such as oxygen or hydrogen.
Proton-exchange membrane fuel cell
Proton-exchange membrane fuel cell (PEMFC) a type of fuel cell based on a polymer electrolyte membrane.
Protonic ceramic fuel cell
Protonic ceramic fuel cell (PCFC) based on a ceramic electrolyte material that exhibits high protonic conductivity at elevated temperatures.

== R ==
Reactor
Reactor, see: bioreactor, membrane reactor and chemical reactor.
Reagent
A reagent or reactant is a substance or compound consumed during a chemical reaction.
Rectifier
A rectifier is an electrical device that converts alternating current (AC) to direct current (DC), a process known as rectification.
Redox
Redox (shorthand for reduction–oxidation reaction) is any chemical reaction in which atoms have their oxidation number (oxidation state) changed.
Reformate
Reformate, hydrocarbon fuel that has been processed into hydrogen and other products for use in fuel cells.
Reformed methanol fuel cell
Reformed methanol fuel cell (RMFC) or indirect methanol fuel cell (IMFC) are a subcategory of proton-exchange fuel cells where the fuel, methanol (CH_{3}OH), is reformed before being fed into the fuel cell.
Reformer
A hydrogen reformer another name for steam reforming a device that extracts hydrogen from other fuels, typically methanol or gasoline, not to be confused with the process catalytic reforming
Reforming
A chemical process in which hydrogen containing fuels react with steam, oxygen, or both to produce a hydrogen-rich gas stream. (syngas)
Reformulated gasoline
Gasoline that is blended so that, on average, it significantly reduces volatile organic compounds and air toxics emissions relative to conventional gasolines.
Regenerative fuel cell
A fuel cell that produces electricity from hydrogen and oxygen and can use electricity from solar power or some other source to divide the excess water into oxygen and hydrogen fuel to be re-used by the fuel cell. See Regenerative fuel cell.
Relief valve
The relief valve is a type of valve used to control or limit the pressure in a system or vessel which can build up by a process upset, instrument or equipment failure, or fire.
Renewable energy
Renewable energy is energy generated from natural resources – such as sunlight, including solar and radiant energy, wind, rain, tides and geothermal heat – which are renewable (naturally replenished).
Reservoir
A reservoir is, most broadly, a place or hollow vessel where something fluid is kept in reserve, for later use.
Response time
In technology, response time is the time a system or functional unit takes to react to a given input.
Reversible fuel cell
Reversible fuel cell (RFC), a fuel cell that can consume chemical A to produce electricity and chemical B and be reversed to consume electricity and chemical B to produce chemical A.
Reynolds number
In fluid mechanics and heat transfer, the Reynolds number $\mathrm{Re}$ is a dimensionless number that gives a measure of the ratio of inertial forces ($v \rho$) to viscous forces ($\mu / L$) and, consequently, it quantifies the relative importance of these two types of forces for given flow conditions.
Rupture disc
A rupture disk or bursting disc is a pressure relief device that protects a vessel or system from overpressurization.
Ruthenium
Ruthenium is used in platinum–ruthenium electrodes for methanol-fuel cells

== S ==
Safety shutoff valve
Safety shutoff valves are safety valves used to close a line and stop the flow of material.
Safety valve
A safety valve is a valve mechanism for the automatic release of a gas from a boiler, pressure vessel, or other system when the pressure or temperature exceeds preset limits.
Salt bridge
A salt bridge, in chemistry, is a laboratory device used to connect the oxidation and reduction half-cells of a galvanic cell (voltaic cell), a type of electrochemical cell. Salt bridge usually comes in two types: glass tube and filter paper.
Scrubber
Scrubber systems are a diverse group of air pollution control devices that can be used to remove some particulates and/or gases from industrial exhaust streams.
Sensor
A sensor is a device that measures a physical quantity and converts it into a signal which can be read by an observer or by an instrument.
Series circuit
Series circuits are sometimes called current-coupled or daisy chain-coupled. The current that flows in a series circuit has to flow through every component in the circuit. Therefore, all of the components in a series connection carry the same current. It has been noted that current flows in series.
Service life
A product's service life is its expected lifetime, or the acceptable period of use in service. It is the time that any manufactured item can be expected to be "serviceable" or supported by its originating manufacturer.
Short circuit
A short circuit (sometimes abbreviated to short or s/c) allows a current along a different path from the one intended.
Sodium borohydride
Sodium borohydride, also known as sodium tetrahydroborate, has the chemical formula NaBH_{4}.
Solenoid valve
A solenoid valve is an electromechanical valve for use with liquid or gas controlled by running or stopping an electric current through a solenoid, which is a coil of wire, thus changing the state of the valve.
Solid oxide electrolyser cell
A solid oxide electrolyser cell (SOEC) is a solid oxide fuel cell set in regenerative mode for the electrolysis of water with a solid oxide, or ceramic, electrolyte to produce oxygen and hydrogen gas.
Solid oxide fuel cell
A solid oxide fuel cell (SOFC) is an electrochemical conversion device that produces electricity directly from oxidizing a fuel.
Solubility
Solubility is the ability of a given substance, the solute, to dissolve in a solvent.
Sorbent
A sorbent is a material used to adsorb either liquids or gases.
Sorption
Sorption is the action of both absorption and adsorption takes place simultaneously.
Specific gravity
Specific gravity is defined as the ratio of the density of a given solid or liquid substance to the density of water at a specific temperature and pressure, typically at 4 °C (39 °F) and 1 atm (29.92 inHg), making it a dimensionless quantity.
Specific heat capacity
Specific heat capacity, also known simply as specific heat, is the measure of the heat energy required to increase the temperature of a unit quantity
Specific power
In engineering, the specific power is power either per unit of mass, volume, or area.
Specific weight
The specific weight (also known as the unit weight) is the weight per unit volume of a material
Stack
Stack, to deliver the desired amount of energy, the fuel cells can be combined in series and parallel circuits, where series yield higher voltage, and parallel allows a stronger current to be drawn. Such a design is called a fuel cell stack.
Standard cubic foot
A standard cubic foot (SFC) is a measure of quantity of gas, equal to a cubic foot of volume at 60 degrees Fahrenheit and either 14.696 pounds-force per square inch (1 atm or 101.325 kPa) or 14.73 psi (30 inHg or 101.6 kPa) of pressure.
Standard electrode potential
In electrochemistry, the standard electrode potential, abbreviated E^{o}, E^{0}, or E^{~~o~~} (with a superscript plimsoll character, pronounced nought), is the measure of individual potential of a reversible electrode (at equilibrium) at standard state, which is with solutes at an effective concentration of 1 mol/kg, and gases at a pressure of 1 atmosphere or 100 kPa (kilopascals).
Stationary fuel-cell applications
Stationary fuel-cell applications (or stationary fuel cell power systems) are stationary (not moving) fuel cell applications
Steady state
Steady state is a more general situation than dynamic equilibrium. If a system is in steady state, then the recently observed behavior of the system will continue into the future.
SMR
Steam methane reforming (SMR) another name for steam reforming
Steam reforming
Steam reforming (SR), hydrogen reforming or catalytic oxidation, is a method of producing hydrogen from hydrocarbons at high temperatures (700–1100 °C) in the presence of a metal-based catalyst (nickel).
Switched-mode power supply
A switched-mode power supply, switching-mode power supply or SMPS, is an electronic power supply unit (PSU) that incorporates a switching regulator.
Syngas
Syngas (from synthesis gas) is the name given to a gas mixture that contains varying amounts of carbon monoxide and hydrogen generated by the gasification of a carbon-containing fuel to a gaseous product with a heating value.

== T ==
Tafel equation
The Tafel equation relates the rate of an electrochemical reaction to the overpotential.
Tail gas combustor
Tail gas combustor (TGC).
Tar
Tar is a viscous black liquid derived from the destructive distillation of organic matter.
Technology assessment
Technology assessment (TA, German: Technikfolgenabschätzung) is the study and evaluation of new technologies.
Technology life cycle
The technology maturity lifecycle is the commercial gain of a product from its research and development phase to its vital life phase before it becomes outdated and replaced. More mature technology has been tested and tweaked so as to reduce faults and flaws
Technology readiness level
Technology readiness level (TRL) is a measure used by some United States government agencies and many of the world's major companies (and agencies) to assess the maturity of evolving technologies (materials, components, devices, etc.) prior to incorporating that technology into a system or subsystem.
Technology validation
Technology validation, confirming that technical targets for a given technology have been met.
Temperature
Temperature is a physical property of a system that underlies the common notions of hot and cold.
Terbium
Terbium is used as a crystal stabilizer of fuel cells which operate at elevated temperatures, together with ZrO_{2}.
Thermal conductivity
In physics, thermal conductivity, $k$, is the property of a material that indicates its ability to conduct heat.
Thermal efficiency
In thermodynamics, the thermal efficiency ($\eta_\text{th}$) is a dimensionless performance measure of a thermal device.
Thermal expansion
When the temperature of a substance changes, the energy that is stored in the intermolecular bonds between atoms changes. When the stored energy increases, so does the length of the molecular bonds. As a result, solids typically expand in response to heating and contract on cooling; this dimensional response to temperature change is expressed by its coefficient of thermal expansion.
Thermal partial oxidation
Thermal partial oxidation (TPOX) is a thermal partial oxidation reaction, which is dependent on the air-fuel ratio, proceed at temperatures of 1200 °C and above.
Thermoelectricity
Thermoelectricity is a class of phenomena in which a temperature difference creates an electric potential or an electric potential creates a temperature difference.
Thermoplastic
A thermoplastic is a plastic that melts to a liquid when heated and freezes to a brittle, very glassy state when cooled sufficiently.
Thermoplastic elastomer
Thermoplastic elastomers (TPE), sometimes referred to as thermoplastic rubbers, are a class of copolymers or a physical mix of polymers (usually a plastic and a rubber) which consist of materials with both thermoplastic and elastomeric properties.
Transducer
A transducer is a device, usually electrical, electronic, electro-mechanical, electromagnetic, photonic, or photovoltaic that converts one type of energy or physical attribute to another for various purposes including measurement or information transfer (for example, pressure sensors).
Transfer switch
A transfer switch allows switching from a primary power source to a secondary or tertiary power source and are employed in some electrical power distribution systems.
Transformer
A transformer is a device that transfers electrical energy from one circuit to another through inductively coupled electrical conductors.
Triple phase boundary
Triple phase boundary (TPB).
Triple point
In thermodynamics, the triple point of a substance is the temperature and pressure at which three phases (for example, gas, liquid, and solid) of that substance coexist in thermodynamic equilibrium.
Turbine
A turbine is a rotary engine that extracts energy from a fluid flow.
Turbocharger
Turbocharger, a device used for increasing the pressure and density of a fluid entering a fuel cell power plant using a compressor driven by a turbine that extracts energy from the exhaust gas.
Turbocompressor
Turbocompressor, a machine for compressing air or other fluid (reactant if supplied to a fuel cell system) in order to increase the reactant pressure and concentration.

== U ==
Ullage
Ullage is the unfilled space in a container of liquid.
Uninterruptible power supply
An uninterruptible power supply (UPS), also known as a continuous power supply (CPS) is a device which maintains a continuous supply of electric power to connected equipment by supplying power from a separate source when utility power is not available.
Unitized regenerative fuel cell
A unitized regenerative fuel cell (URFC) is a fuel cell based on the proton-exchange membrane which can do the electrolysis of water in regenerative mode and function in the other mode as a fuel cell recombining oxygen and hydrogen gas to produce electricity.

== V ==
Vacuum pump
A vacuum pump is a device that removes gas molecules from a sealed volume in order to leave behind a partial vacuum.
Vapor–liquid equilibrium
Vapor–liquid equilibrium, abbreviated as VLE by some, is a condition where a liquid and its vapor (gas phase) are in equilibrium with each other, a condition or state where the rate of evaporation (liquid changing to vapor) equals the rate of condensation (vapor changing to liquid) on a molecular level such that there is no net (overall) vapor-liquid interconversion.
Vapor pressure
Vapor pressure (also known as equilibrium vapor pressure or saturation vapor pressure), is the pressure of a vapor in equilibrium with its non-vapor phases.
Vapor recovery
Vapor recovery (or vapour) recovery is the process of recovering the vapors of gasoline or other fuels, so that they do not escape into the atmosphere.
Voltage
Electrical tension (or voltage after its SI unit, the volt) is the difference of electrical potential between two points of an electrical or electronic circuit, expressed in volts.
Voltage converter
A voltage converter changes the voltage of an electrical power source and is usually combined with other components to create a power supply.
Voltage drop
Voltage drop is the reduction in voltage in an electrical circuit between the source and load.
Voltage regulator
A voltage regulator is an electrical regulator designed to automatically maintain a constant voltage level.
Volumetric energy density
Volumetric energy density, potential energy in a given volume of fuel.
Volumetric flow rate
The volumetric flow rate (also known as volume flow rate or rate of fluid flow) in fluid dynamics and hydrometry is the volume of fluid which passes through a given surface per unit time (for example cubic meters per second [m^{3}/s] in SI units, or cubic feet per second [cu ft/s]). It is usually represented by the symbol Q.
Volumetric heat capacity
Volumetric heat capacity (VHC) is the ability of a given volume of a substance to store internal energy while undergoing a given temperature change, but without undergoing a phase transition.

== W ==
Water
Water (H_{2}O) in typical usage, water refers only to its liquid form or state, but the substance also has a solid state, ice, and a gaseous state, water vapor or steam.
Water gas shift reaction
The water gas shift reaction (WGS) is a chemical reaction in which carbon monoxide reacts with water to form carbon dioxide and hydrogen
Water purification
Water purification is the process of removing contaminants and other harmful microorganisms from a raw water source.
Water vapor
Water vapor or water vapour (see spelling differences), also aqueous vapor, is the gas phase of water.
Watt
The watt (symbol: W) is the SI derived unit of power, equal to one joule of energy per second. It measures a rate of energy use or production.
Wet basis
It is customary to report the product composition data in steam reforming reactions on a steam free basis (dry basis) since the steam is not a constituent in any of the synthesis gases produced or in the reformed gas when used as a fuel; however, if steam is to be considered in the product composition data as well, then the calculation would be wet basis.
W/kg
Kilowatts per kilogram (generally, W/kg).The power per unit of mass in relation to the power-to-weight ratio.
Wt.%
In hydrogen storage research, weight percent (wt.%, also called mass percent) is the amount of hydrogen stored on a weight basis. This can apply to materials that store hydrogen or for the entire storage system (e.g., material or compressed/liquid hydrogen as well as the tank and other equipment required to contain the hydrogen such as insulation, valves, regulators, etc.). For example, 6 wt.% on a system-basis means that 6% of the entire system by weight is hydrogen. On a material basis, the wt.% is the mass of hydrogen divided by the mass of material plus hydrogen.

== Y ==
Yttria-stabilized zirconia
Yttria-stabilized zirconia (YSZ) is a zirconium-oxide-based ceramic.

== Z ==
Zinc-air battery
A zinc-air battery (non-rechargeable) and zinc-air fuel cells (mechanically rechargeable) are electro-chemical batteries powered by the oxidation of zinc with oxygen from the air.
Zinc oxide
Zinc oxide is a chemical compound with the formula ZnO. (sulfur sorbent)

== Acronyms ==
Acronym	–
AAEM	alkali anion-exchange membrane
AC	alternating current
AFC	alkaline fuel cell
ATR	autothermal reforming
APU	auxiliary power unit
BASE	beta-alumina solid electrolyte
BOP	balance of plant
BTU	British thermal unit
°C	celsius
C	carbon
C	coulomb
ca. or c.	circa
CGH_{2}	compressed hydrogen
CH_{4}	methane
CH_{3}CH_{2}OH	ethanol
CH_{3}OH	methanol
CHP	combined heat and power
CI	chloride ion
CNG	compressed natural gas
CNT	carbon nanotube
CO_{2}	carbon dioxide
CO	carbon monoxide
CPOX	catalytic partial oxidation
CPS	continuous power supply
DBFC	direct borohydride fuel cell
DC	direct current
DCFC	direct carbon fuel cell
DEFC	direct-ethanol fuel cell
DER	distributed energy resource
DFAFC	formic acid fuel cell
DMFC	direct methanol fuel cell
E^{0}	standard electrode potential
EBOP	electrical balance of plant
EGFC	electro-galvanic fuel cell
EOF	electroosmotic flow
EOP	electroosmotic pump
°F	fahrenheit
FB	flow battery
FC	fuel cell
FGD	flue-gas desulfurization
FMEA	failure mode and effects analysis
FPS	fuel processing system
GDC	gadolinium doped ceria
GEG	gasoline-equivalent gallon
GGE	gasoline gallon equivalent
GHSV	gas hourly space velocity (see space velocity)
H_{2}	hydrogen
H_{2}O	water
HC	hydrocarbon
HCDP	hydrocarbon dew point
HCOOH	formic acid
HDP	hydrocarbon dew point
HDS	hydrodesulfurization
HEV	hybrid electric vehicle
HHV	higher heating value
HTS	high temperature shift
ICE	internal combustion engine
IMFC	indirect methanol fuel cell
KG	kilogram
KOH	potassium hydroxide
kW	kilowatt
kWh	kilowatt hour
kW/kg	Kilowatts per kilogram
kW/m3	Kilowatts per cubic meter
kW/sq.m	Kilowatts per square meter
LCA	life cycle assessment
LDH	layered double hydroxides
LEL	lower explosive limit
LFG	landfill gas
LFL	lower flammable limit
LH_{2}	liquid hydrogen
LHSV	liquid hourly space velocity (see space velocity)
LHV	lower heating value
LNG	liquefied natural gas
LOD	limit of detection
LPG	liquefied petroleum gas
LSM	lanthanum strontium manganite
LTS	low temperature shift
MAF	mass flow sensor
MAOP	maximum allowable operating pressure
MBOP	mechanical balance of plant
MCFC	molten-carbonate fuel cell
mCHP	micro combined heat and power
MDT	mean down time
MEA	membrane electrode assembly
MeOH	methanol
MFC	microbial fuel cell
mm	millimeter
MPGe	miles per gallon of gasoline equivalent
MRO	maintenance, repair and operations
MSR	methanol steam reforming
MTBF	mean time between failures
MTBO	mean time between outages
MW	megawatt
mW	milliwatt
N_{2}	nitrogen
NEG	net energy gain
NO_{x}	nitrogen oxide
O	oxygen
OCV	open-circuit voltage
OEM	original equipment manufacturer
Pa	pascal
PAFC	phosphoric acid fuel cell
PBI	polybenzimidazole fiber
PCFC	protonic ceramic fuel cell
Pd	palladium
p.d.	potential difference
PEC	photoelectrochemical cell
PEDOT	poly(3,4-ethylenedioxythiophene)
PEDT	poly(3,4-ethylenedioxythiophene)
PEFC	polymer electrolyte membrane fuel cell
PEM	polymer electrolyte membrane or proton-exchange membrane
PEMFC	polymer electrolyte membrane fuel cell or proton-exchange membrane fuel cell
PM	particulate matter
POX	partial oxidation
ppm	parts per million
ppmv	parts per million volume
PROX	preferential oxidation
PRV	pressure relief valve
PSA	pressure swing adsorption
PSU	power supply unit
Pt	platinum
PTFE	polytetrafluoroethylene
Pv	power density
Re	reynolds number
RESS	rechargeable energy storage system
RFC	reversible fuel cell
RMFC	reformed methanol fuel cell
RWGS	reversed water-gas shift reaction
s/c	short circuit or steam to carbon ratio (carbon = hydrocarbon used for SR)
SFC	standard cubic foot or sometimes solid oxide fuel cell
SMPS	switched-mode power supply
SMR	steam methane reforming
SOEC	solid oxide electrolyser cell
SOFC	solid oxide fuel cell
SR	steam reforming
TA	technology assessment
TGC	tail-gas combustor
TOF	turnover frequency
TOS	time on stream (also T.O.S)
TPB	triple-phase boundary
TPE	thermoplastic elastomers
TPOX	thermal partial oxidation
TRL	technology readiness level
UEL	upper explosive limit
UPS	uninterruptible power supply
URFC	unitized regenerative fuel cell
VHC	volumetric heat capacity
VLE	vapor–liquid equilibrium
W	watt
WGS	water–gas shift reaction
WHSV	weight hourly space velocity (see space velocity)
Wt.%	weight percent
YSZ	yttria-stabilized zirconia
ZnO	zinc oxide
