= FAFC =

FAFC may refer to:

- Fisher Athletic F.C., an English football (soccer) club
- Forfar Albion F.C., a Scottish football (soccer) club
- Forfar Athletic F.C., a Scottish football (soccer) club
- Formic acid fuel cell
- Frickley Athletic F.C., an English football (soccer) club
