= Gas diffusion electrode =

Electrodes with a conjunction of a solid, liquid and gaseous interface

Gas diffusion electrodes (GDE) are electrodes with a conjunction of a solid, liquid and gaseous interface, and an electrical conducting catalyst supporting an electrochemical reaction between the liquid and the gaseous phase.

== Principle ==
In fuel cells, GDEs enable the reaction of oxygen and hydrogen to form water, while simultaneously converting the chemical bond energy into electrical energy. Usually the catalyst is fixed in a porous foil, so that the liquid and the gas can interact. Besides these wetting characteristics, the gas diffusion electrode must offer an optimal electric conductivity, in order to enable an electron transport with low ohmic resistance.

An important prerequisite for the operation of GDEs is that both the liquid and the gaseous phase coexist in the pore system of the electrodes which can be demonstrated with the Young–Laplace equation:

$$p= \frac {2\ \gamma \cos \theta} {r}$$

The gas pressure p is in relation to the liquid in the pore system over the pore radius r, the surface tension γ of the liquid and the contact angle θ. This equation is to be taken as a guide for determination because there are too many unknown, or difficult to achieve, parameters. When the surface tension is considered, the difference in surface tension between the solid and the liquid has to be taken into account. But the surface tension of catalysts such as platinum on carbon or silver are hardly measurable. The contact angle on a flat surface can be determined with a microscope. A single pore, however, cannot be examined, so it is necessary to determine the pore system of an entire electrode. Thus in order to create an electrode area for liquid and gas, the path can be chosen to create different pore radii r, or to create different wetting angles θ.

== Sintered electrode ==
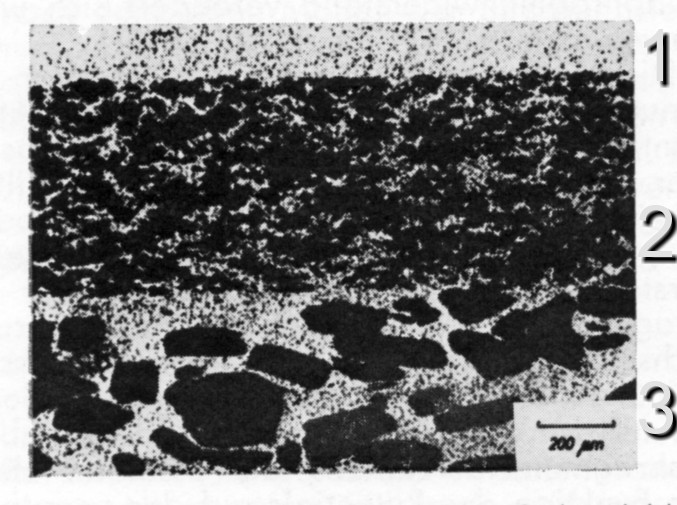
Sintered electrode

In this image of a sintered electrode it can be seen that three different grain sizes were used. The different layers were:

1. top layer of fine-grained material
2. layer from different groups
3. gas distribution layer of coarse-grained material

Most of the electrodes that were manufactured from 1950 to 1970 with the sintered method were for use in fuel cells. This type of production was dropped for economic reasons because the electrodes were thick and heavy, with a common thickness of 2 mm, while the individual layers had to be very thin and without defects. The sales price was too high and the electrodes could not be produced continuously.

=== Principle of operation ===
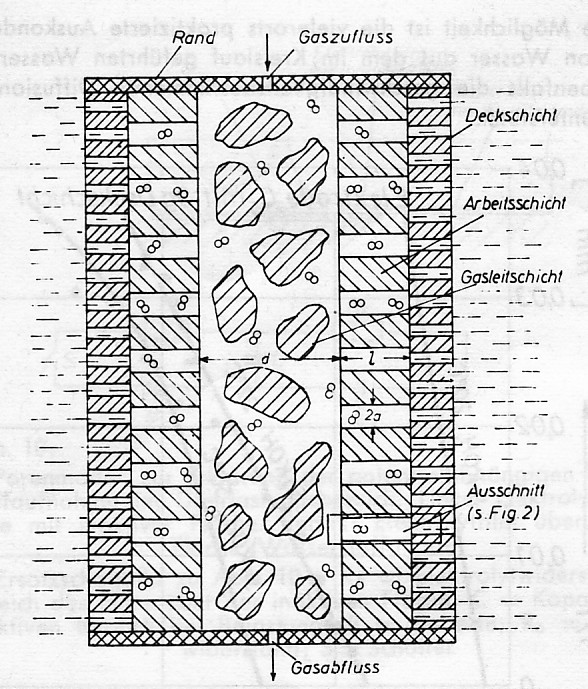
Principle of the gas diffusion electrode

The principle of gas diffusion is illustrated in this diagram. The so-called gas distribution layer is located in the middle of the electrode. With only a small gas pressure, the electrolyte is displaced from this pore system. A small flow resistance ensures that the gas can freely flow inside the electrode. At a slightly higher gas pressure the electrolyte in the pore system is restricted to the work layer. The surface layer itself has such fine pores that, even when the pressure peaks, gas cannot flow through the electrode into the electrolyte. Such electrodes were produced by scattering and subsequent sintering or hot pressing. To produce multi-layered electrodes a fine-grained material was scattered in a mold and smoothed. Then, the other materials were applied in multiple layers and put under pressure. The production was not only error-prone but also time-consuming and difficult to automate.

== Bonded electrode ==
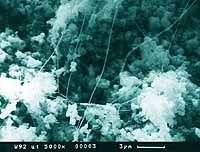
SEM-image from the PTFE-silver electrode

Since about 1970, PTFEs are used to produce an electrode having both hydrophilic and hydrophobic properties while chemically stable and which can be used as binders. This means that, in places with a high proportion of PTFE, no electrolyte can penetrate the pore system and vice versa. In that case the catalyst itself should be non-hydrophobic.

=== Variations ===
There are two technical variations to produce PTFE catalyst-mixtures:

- Dispersion of water, PTFE, catalyst, emulsifiers, thickening agents...
- Dry mixture of PTFE powder and catalyst powder

The dispersion route is chosen mainly for electrodes with polymer electrolytes, as successfully introduced in the proton exchange membrane fuel cell (PEM fuel cell) and in proton exchange membrane (PEM) or hydrochloric acid (HCL) membrane electrolysis. When used in liquid electrolyte, a dry process is more appropriate.

Also, in the dispersion route (through evaporation of water and sintering of the PTFEs at 340 °C) the mechanical pressing is skipped and the produced electrodes are very porous. With fast drying methods, cracks can form in the electrodes which can be penetrated by the liquid electrolyte. For applications with liquid electrolytes, such as the zinc-air battery or the alkaline fuel cell, the dry mixture method is used.

== Catalyst ==
In acidic electrolytes the catalysts are usually precious metals like platinum, ruthenium, iridium and rhodium. In alkaline electrolytes, like zinc-air batteries and alkaline fuel cells, it is usual to use less expensive catalysts like carbon, manganese, silver, nickel foam or nickel mesh.

== Application ==
At first solid electrodes were used in the Grove cell, Francis Thomas Bacon was the first to use gas diffusion electrodes for the Bacon fuel cell, converting hydrogen and oxygen at high temperature into electricity. Over the years, gas diffusion electrodes have been adapted for various other processes like:

- Zinc-air battery since 1980
- Nickel-metal hydride battery since 1990
- Chlorine production by electrolysis of waste hydrochloric acid
- Chloralkali process
- Electrochemical reduction of carbon dioxide

== Production ==
GDE is produced at all levels. It is not only used for research and development firms but for larger companies as well in the production of a membrane electrode assembly (MEA) that is in most cases used in a fuel cell or battery apparatus. Companies that specialize in high volume production of GDE include Johnson Matthey, Gore and Gaskatel. However, there are many companies which produce custom or low quantity GDE, allowing different shapes, catalysts and loadings to be evaluated as well, which include FuelCellStore, FuelCellsEtc, and many others.

== See also ==
- Anion exchange membrane
- Concentration cell
- Electrode potential
- Glossary of fuel cell terms
- Ion transport number
- Ion selective electrode
- Liquid junction potential
