= PCFC =

PCFC may refer to:

== Association football clubs ==
- Pakuan City F.C., West Java, Indonesia
- Pittsburgh City United FC, Pennsylvania, United States
- Polokwane City F.C., Limpopo province, South Africa
- Pontefract Collieries F.C., West Yorkshire, England
- Prescot Cables F.C., Merseyside, England

== Other ==
- Protonic ceramic fuel cell
