= Hydrogen sulfide sensor =

Hydrogen sulfide (H_{2}S) is a noxious gas characterized by its distinctive stench reminiscent of rotten eggs. It goes by several colloquial names, including sour gas, sewer gas, stink damp, swamp gas, and manure gas. This gas naturally occurs in crude petroleum, natural gas, hot springs, and certain food items. In the natural world, H_{2}S is a common byproduct of the decomposition of organic matter, such as human and animal waste, in septic and sewer systems due to bacterial processes. Additionally, it is industrially produced in significant quantities through activities and facilities like petroleum and natural gas extraction, refining, wastewater treatment, coke ovens, tanneries, kraft paper mills, and landfills.

A hydrogen sulfide sensor or H_{2}S sensor is a gas sensor for the measurement of hydrogen sulfide.

== Principle ==
The H_{2}S sensor is a metal oxide semiconductor (MOS) sensor which operates by a reversible change in resistance caused by adsorption and desorption of hydrogen sulfide in a film with hydrogen sulfide sensitive material like tin oxide thick films and gold thin films. Current response time is 25 ppb to 10 ppm < one minute.

== Gas sensing mechanism ==
The fundamental principle underlying gas detection in MOS-based gas sensors relies on alterations in the electrical conductivity or resistivity of MOS. In MOS, operating within typical temperature ranges and under ordinary atmospheric conditions, the presence of atmospheric oxygen results in the formation of an electron-depleted surface layer, which either adsorbs or chemisorbs the oxygen molecules from the surrounding air. Initially, when the surface layer is exposed to the air, oxygen ions such as O^{−2}, O^{−}, and O_{2} are adsorbed onto the metal oxide grains, causing a band bending effect and the creation of a depletion region known as the space charge field.

When specific target gas particles come into contact with the surface of the metal oxide grains, they interact with the oxygen anions, leading to a modification in the electron concentration within the metal oxide materials. Consequently, this alteration induces a change in conductivity, thus generating an electronic response signal that can be quantified. The detection mechanism employed by metal oxide gas sensors is linked to the adsorption of ions and species on their surfaces. When the gas sensor is exposed to oxygen, adsorbed oxygen particles are formed, with oxygen atoms stripping electrons from the interior of the metal oxide. The ensuing sequence of reactions illustrates the kinetics of this adsorption process .

O_{2}(gas) ⇄ O_{2} (absorbed),

O_{2}(absorbed) + e^{−} ⇌ O^{2−}, (<100°C),

O^{2−} + e^{−} ⇌ 2O^{−} (100−300°C),

and O^{−} + e^{−} ⇌ O_{2}^{−} (>300°C).

The composition of chemisorbed oxygen ions on gas sensors is contingent upon the operational temperature. At temperatures below 100 °C, O^{−2} ions are prevalent, while in the range between 100 °C and 300 °C, O^{−} ions predominate. For temperatures exceeding 300 °C, the predominant chemisorbed oxygen ions shift to O_{2}^{−}.

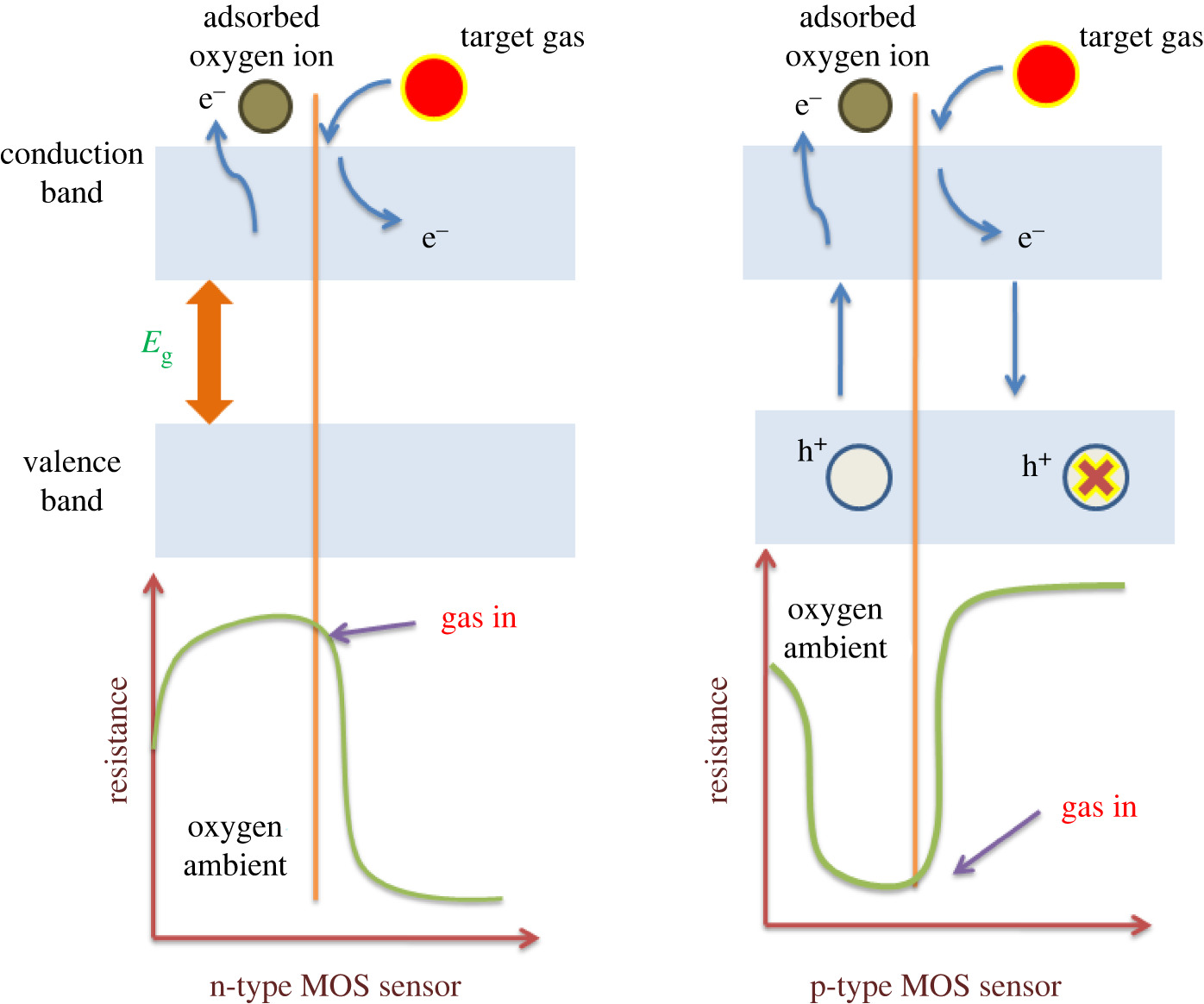
Fig1.Schematic diagram: sensing mechanism of n-type and p-type MOS.

Naturally occurring hazardous gases can be categorized into two groups based on their oxidizing and reducing effects. Gases like NO_{2}, NO, N_{2}O, and CO_{2} are considered oxidizing agents, while H_{2}S, CO, NH_{3}, CH_{4}, and SO_{2} fall into the reducing category. When an n-type MOs gas sensor is exposed to an oxidizing gas, the target gas interacts with the surrounding oxygen ions and captures electrons at the sensor's surface. This interaction leads to a reduction in the electron concentration within the MOS. Since electrons are the primary charge carriers in n-type MOS, their conductance decreases when exposed to oxidizing gases.

In contrast, in a p-type MOS gas sensor, holes serve as the primary charge carriers. When exposed to oxidizing gases, the extracted electrons increase the concentration of holes within the MOS. Consequently, the conductance of p-type MOS increases in the presence of oxidizing gases. Figure 1 provides a schematic diagram illustrating the sensing mechanism for n-type and p-type MOS.

== Applications ==
This type of sensor has been under constant development because of the toxic and corrosive nature of hydrogen sulfide:

- The H_{2}S sensor is used to detect hydrogen sulfide in the hydrogen feed stream of fuel cells to prevent catalyst poisoning and to measure the quality of guard beds used to remove sulfur from hydrocarbon fuels./-

== Research ==
- 2004 — a nanocrystalline SnO_{2}–Ag on ceramic wafer sensor is reported.

== See also ==
- Calibration
- CMOS
- Drift (sensor)
- Glossary of fuel cell terms
- List of sensors
- Microelectromechanical systems
- Thin film metal oxide semiconductor
