= Ethylene acrylic acid =

Copolymer from ethylene and acrylic acid

Ethylene acrylic acid (EAA, poly(ethylene acrylic acid), or PEAA) is a copolymer from ethylene and acrylic acid. The ratio between the two different monomers can be varied, which may significantly alter the material properties (such as polarity, crystallinity and solubility), making them suitable for various applications.

== Properties ==
The material properties of EAA are dependent on the ratio between the ethylene and acrylic acid monomers.

Increasing the amount of acrylic acid lowers the glass transition temperature (Tg) and melting temperature (Tm). As such, the required temperature for heat-sealing can be decreased.

== Applications ==
EAA is a versatile material that finds many applications. It can be used, for example, in flexible packaging, protective metal coatings, aqueous dispersions, glass adhesives, and ink and paint formulations.

== Crosslinking ==
Crosslinking of EEA with a metal ion

EAA can be crosslinked in different ways to further tune its material properties and overall strength.

Because EAA contains carboxylic acid groups, these can naturally form crosslinks between individual polymer chains via hydrogen bonding.

Alternatively, EAA can be crosslinked via coordination with metal ions. Such materials are often referred to as ionomers, and different metal salts can be used.
