= MTBO =

MTBO can stand for:

- Mean time between outages, the mean time between equipment failures that result in loss of system continuity or unacceptable degradation
- Mountain bike orienteering, a variant in which orienteering is done on a mountain bike
