= Solid acid fuel cell =

Solid acid fuel cells (SAFCs) are a class of fuel cells characterized by the use of a solid acid material as the electrolyte. Similar to proton exchange membrane fuel cells and solid oxide fuel cells, they extract electricity from the electrochemical conversion of hydrogen- and oxygen-containing gases, leaving only water as a byproduct. Current SAFC systems use hydrogen gas obtained from a range of different fuels, such as industrial-grade propane and diesel. They operate at mid-range temperatures, from 200 to 300 °C.

== Solid acid material ==
In the context of SAFCs, solid acids are proton-conducting materials whose chemistry and properties lie between those of normal acids and normal salts—they are conductive due to the protons from the "acid" contribution, and they are brittle due to the "salt" contribution. These materials are based on oxyanion groups such as SO^{2−}_{4}, PO^{3−}_{4}, SeO^{2−}_{4}, or AsO^{3−}_{4} linked together by hydrogen bonds and charge-balanced by large cation species such as Cs^{+}, Rb^{+}, NH^{+}_{4}, or K^{+}. The first example of a solid acid electrolyte material in a proof-of-concept SAFC was in 2000, using caesium hydrogen sulfate, CsHSO_{4}. Since then, however, the best-performing SAFCs have been shown to use caesium dihydrogen phosphate, CsH_{2}PO_{4}.

Various methods are available for synthesis of the solid acid materials and their composites, including slow isothermal evaporation of mixtures, solvent-induced precipitation, dry mixing, electrospinning, sol-gel, thin-film casting, and impregnation. The main parameters that must be tuned during synthesis are temperature, pressure, heating duration, and grinding/mixing because these are the factors that affect the resulting structure of the electrolyte. Currently, the preferred method in the literature is mixing with water followed by solvent-induced precipitation, due to the fact that this method is high-throughput and easy to reproduce. This method typically produces polycrystalline powders of the solid acids, whereas slow isothermal evaporation produces single crystals. The ideal method must be determined based on the desired function or application.

Solid acids are ideal as electrolytes for fuel cell applications due to their "superprotonic" structures that occur at transition temperatures well-within the operating temperatures of the SAFC. CsH_{2}PO_{4} demonstrates high proton conductivity values of 2.2×10^{−2} S cm^{−1} at 240 °C, and CsHSO_{4} boasts a proton conductivity of 4×10^{−2} S cm^{−1} at 200 °C. The solid acid "superprotonic" structure and property arises from a phase transition occurring between 100 °C to 250 °C for most solid acids, at which point the conductivity can increase by two to three orders of magnitude. CsH_{2}PO_{4}, in particular, experiences an increase in conductivity by four orders of magnitude through the superprotonic phase transition. This high conductivity allows for peak power densities as high as 415 mW/cm^{2} in CsH_{2}PO_{4}-based SAFCs and efficiencies of up to 50% on various fuels.

An advantage of solid acids as an alternative to conventional polymer membrane electrolytes (PEM) in fuel cells is that they do not require hydration in order to function as an electrolyte. Polymer electrolyte membranes require constant hydration to maintain acceptable conductivity levels, but hydration can simultaneously degrade these membranes. This constrains the operating temperature of the PEM fuel cell to below 100 °C. In contrast, the flexibility of the solid acid is such that the fuel cell can operate at mid-range temperatures, thereby eliminating the additional issues of electrocatalyst inefficiencies and intolerance to fuel impurities that arise from the lower operating temperatures of PEM fuel cells. The consequence of this higher tolerance is that SAFCs can run on hydrogen gas that has been extracted from biodiesels and other impure forms of hydrocarbons, paving the way for a more versatile and deployable fuel cell technology. An additional benefit of the higher operating temperatures of SAFCs is that non-platinum alloy and transition metal oxide electrocatalysts can be used, which are typically cheaper than the platinum catalysts found in PEM fuel cells.

Despite the advantages of SAFCs over PEM fuel cells, there are also drawbacks. One major drawback of CsHSO_{4} is its solubility in water, and practical difficulties in fabricating sufficiently thin membranes. Additionally, reactions involving H_{2} gas, CsHSO_{4} electrolyte, and typical SAFC electrocatalysts can lead to the degradation of the anode material, eventually leading to SAFC performance loss after only modest usage. This combination of detrimental effects is the reason that recent research efforts have pivoted towards focusing more on developing CsH_{2}PO_{4} electrolytes. Although CsH_{2}PO_{4} does not require hydration to improve its conductivity, it does require some level of hydration to prevent dissociation into a salt and water vapor. Typically, this hydration is provided by humidifying the H_{2} and O_{2} supply to the fuel cell. Another study showed that the humidification of the supplies does not affect fuel cell performance, however, which suggests that further investigation of this behavior is needed. A third study indicated that humidification has little effects on the short-term SAFC performance tests but becomes necessary for long-term stability and performance. There is also controversy in the literature as to whether the higher operating temperatures of SAFCs could potentially also lead to the dehydration or decomposition of CsH_{2}PO_{4}. One approach to improve thermal stability has been to dope the solid acids with oxide materials such as silica or alumina, which can both increase stability and enhance proton transport for CsHSO_{4} but has yet to be explored for CsH_{2}PO_{4}.

== Electrode reactions ==
Hydrogen gas is channeled to the anode, where it is split into protons and electrons. Protons travel through the solid acid electrolyte to reach the cathode, while electrons travel to the cathode through an external circuit, generating electricity. At the cathode, protons and electrons recombine along with oxygen to produce water that is then removed from the system.

Anode: H_{2} → 2 H^{+} + 2 e^{−}

Cathode: 1/2 O_{2} + 2 H^{+} + 2 e^{−} → H_{2}O

Overall: H_{2} + 1/2 O_{2} → H_{2}O

== Cell fabrication and production ==
In 2005, SAFCs were fabricated with thin CsH_{2}PO_{4} electrolyte membranes of 25 micrometer thickness, resulting in an eightfold increase in peak power densities compared to earlier models. Thin electrolyte membranes are necessary to minimize the voltage lost due to internal resistance within the membrane. These thin electrolyte membranes were fabricated by slurry deposition, wherein toluene was used as the suspension medium for the solid acid. The layers of the cell were deposited as follows onto a gas diffusion stainless steel electrode: electrocatalyst, CsH_{2}PO_{4} electrolyte, second electrocatalyst, and the final gas diffusion layer. As is typical for most fuel cell systems, the entire cell sandwich must be uniaxially pressed to enhance adhesion at the interfaces between layers.

The ideal solid acid fuel cell anode is a "porous electrolyte nanostructure uniformly covered with a platinum thin film". Such electrodes can be prepared by spray drying, such as by depositing CsH_{2}PO_{4} nanoparticles and creating porous, 3-dimensional interconnected nanostructures of the solid acid fuel cell electrolyte material CsH_{2}PO_{4}.

== Electrode catalysts ==
SAFCs, like many other types of fuel cells, utilize electrochemical catalysts on the electrodes to increase cell efficiency. Platinum is the most common choice for SAFCs due to its high reaction activity and stability. Initially, platinum nanoparticles were deposited directly on the electrode surface, but these nanoparticles agglomerated throughout fuel cell operation. Recent studies have incorporated carbon-based supports (carbon nanotubes, graphene, etc.) to reduced agglomeration. Here platinum nanoparticles are deposited directly onto the carbon-based support via processes like atomic layer deposition or metal-organic chemical vapor deposition.

SAFCs have a high tolerance to catalyst poisoning due to the stability of CsH_{2}PO_{4} at operating temperatures. However, one recent study has proposed local hotspots around the current collector fibers can cause catalyst poisoning. According to Wagner et al. 2021, local hotspots can form a liquid phase of CsH_{2}PO_{4} that introduces phosphate groups to the platinum catalyst, degrading fuel cell operation. The introduction of a microporous current collector was found to improve the morphological stability of CsH_{2}PO_{4} and, consequently, mitigate catalyst poisoning.

== Mechanical stability ==
Compared to their high operating temperature counterparts such as high temperature protonic ceramic fuel cells or solid oxide fuel cells, solid acid fuel cells benefit from operating at low temperatures where plastic deformation and creep mechanisms are less likely to cause permanent damage to the cell materials. Permanent deformation occurs more readily at elevated temperatures because defects present within the material have sufficient energy to move and disrupt the original structure. Lower temperature operation also allows for the use of non-refractory materials which tends to decrease the cost of the SAFC.

However, solid acid fuel cell electrolyte materials are still susceptible to mechanical degradation under normal operating conditions above their superprotonic phase transition temperatures due to the superplasticity enabled by this transition. For instance in the case of CsHSO_{4}, a study has shown that the material can undergo strain rates as high as 10^{−2} s^{−1} for an applied compressive stress in the range of several MPa. Since fuel cells often require pressures in this range to properly seal the device and prevent leaks, creep is likely to degrade the cells by creating a short circuiting path. The same study showed that the strain rate, as modeled using the standard steady-state creep equation

$$\dot{\epsilon} = A \sigma^n e^{\frac{-Q}{kT}},$$

has a stress exponent of n = 3.6 typically associated with a dislocation glide mechanism, and an activation energy of 1.02 eV. n is the stress exponent, Q is the creep activation energy, and A is a constant that depends on the creep mechanism. Another study focused on thin CsH_{2}PO_{4} membranes emphasized that while thinner membranes are preferred for promoting conductivity, they can be more susceptible to mechanical degradation and physical leaks, leading to a loss of cell stability.

Creep resistance can be obtained by precipitate strengthening using a composite electrolyte whereby ceramic particles are introduced to prevent dislocation motion. For example, the strain rate of CsH_{2}PO_{4} was reduced by a factor of 5 by mixing in SiO_{2} particles with a size of 2 μm, however resulting in a 20% decrease in protonic conductivity.

Other studies have looked at CsH_{2}PO_{4}/epoxy resin composites where micron size particles of CsH_{2}PO_{4} are embedded in a cross-linked polymer matrix. A comparison between the flexural strength of an SiO_{2} composite versus an epoxy composite demonstrated that while the strengths themselves are similar, the flexibility of the epoxy composite is superior, a property which is essential in preventing electrolyte fracture during operation. The epoxy composite also shows comparable but slightly lower conductivities than the SiO_{2} composite when operating at temperatures below 200 °C.

== Applications ==
Because of their moderate temperature requirements and compatibility with several types of fuel, SAFCs can be utilized in remote locations where other types of fuel cells would be impractical. In particular, SAFC systems for remote oil and gas applications have been deployed to electrify wellheads and eliminate the use of pneumatic components, which vent methane and other potent greenhouse gases straight into the atmosphere. A smaller, portable SAFC system is in development for military applications that will run on standard logistic fuels, like marine diesel and JP8.

In 2014, a toilet that chemically transforms waste into water and fertilizer was developed using a combination of solar power and SAFCs.
