= Anion-exchange membrane =

Semipermeable membrane

An anion exchange membrane (AEM) is a semipermeable membrane generally made from ionomers and designed to conduct anions but reject gases such as oxygen or hydrogen.

== Applications ==
Anion exchange membranes are used in electrolytic cells and fuel cells to separate reactants present around the two electrodes while transporting the anions essential for the cell operation. An important example is the hydroxide anion exchange membrane used to separate the electrodes of a direct methanol fuel cell (DMFC) or direct-ethanol fuel cell (DEFC).

Poly(fluorenyl-co-aryl piperidinium) (PFAP)-based anion exchange materials (electrolyte membrane and electrode binder) with high ion conductivity and durability under alkaline conditions has been demonstrated for use to extract hydrogen from water. Performance was 7.68 A/cm^{2} at 2 V, some 6x the performance of existing materials. Its yield is about 1.2 times that of commercial proton-exchange membrane technology (6 A/cm2), and it does not require the use of expensive rare-earth elements. The system works by increasing the specific surface area.

== See also ==
- Alkaline anion-exchange membrane fuel cells
- Alkaline fuel cell
- Anion exchange membrane electrolysis
- Artificial membrane
- Gas diffusion electrode
- Glossary of fuel cell terms
- Ion exchange
- Ion-exchange membranes
- Proton-exchange membrane
