= Alkaline fuel cell =

Type of fuel cell

Diagram of an Alkaline Fuel Cell: 1. Hydrogen; 2. Electron flow; 3. Load; 4. Oxygen; 5. Cathode; 6. Electrolyte; 7. Anode; 8. Water; 9. Hydroxide Ions

The alkaline fuel cell (AFC), also known as the Bacon fuel cell after its British inventor, Francis Thomas Bacon, is one of the most developed fuel cell technologies. Alkaline fuel cells consume hydrogen and pure oxygen, to produce potable water, heat, and electricity. They are among the most efficient fuel cells, having the potential to reach 70%.

NASA has used alkaline fuel cells since the mid-1960s, in the Apollo-series missions and on the Space Shuttle.

== Half Reactions ==
The fuel cell produces power through a redox reaction between hydrogen and oxygen. At the anode, hydrogen is oxidized according to the reaction:

$$\ce{H2 + 2OH- -> {2H2O} + 2e-}$$

producing water and releasing electrons. The electrons flow through an external circuit and return to the cathode, reducing oxygen in the reaction:

$$\ce{O2 + {2H2O} + 4e- -> 4OH-}$$

producing hydroxide ions. The net reaction consumes one oxygen molecule and two hydrogen molecules in the production of two water molecules. Electricity and heat are formed as by-products of this reaction.

== Electrolyte ==
The two electrodes are separated by a porous matrix saturated with an aqueous alkaline solution, such as potassium hydroxide (KOH). Aqueous alkaline solutions do not reject carbon dioxide (CO_{2}) so the fuel cell can become "poisoned" through the conversion of KOH to potassium carbonate (K_{2}CO_{3}). Because of this, alkaline fuel cells typically operate on pure oxygen, or at least purified air and would incorporate a 'scrubber' into the design to clean out as much of the carbon dioxide as is possible. Because the generation and storage requirements of oxygen make pure-oxygen AFCs expensive, there are few companies engaged in active development of the technology. There is, however, some debate in the research community over whether the poisoning is permanent or reversible. The main mechanisms of poisoning are blocking of the pores in the cathode with K_{2}CO_{3}, which is not reversible, and reduction in the ionic conductivity of the electrolyte, which may be reversible by returning the KOH to its original concentration. An alternate method involves simply replacing the KOH which returns the cell back to its original output.

When carbon dioxide reacts with the electrolyte carbonates are formed. The carbonates could precipitate on the pores of electrodes that eventually block them. It has been found that AFCs operating at higher temperature do not show a reduction in performance, whereas at around room temperature, a significant drop in performance has been shown. The carbonate poisoning at ambient temperature is thought to be a result of the low solubility of K_{2}CO_{3} around room temperature, which leads to precipitation of K_{2}CO_{3} that blocks the electrode pores. Also, these precipitants gradually decrease the hydrophobicity of the electrode backing layer leading to structural degradation and electrode flooding.

$$\ce{CO2 + {2KOH} -> K2CO3 + {H2O}}$$

On the other hand, the charge-carrying hydroxide ions in the electrolyte can react with carbon dioxide from organic fuel oxidation (i.e. methanol, formic acid) or air to form carbonate species.

$$\ce{{2OH^-} + CO2 -> {CO3^{2-}} + {H2O}}$$

Carbonate formation depletes hydroxide ions from the electrolyte, which reduces electrolyte conductivity and consequently cell performance. As well as these bulk effects, the effect on water management due to a change in vapor pressure and/or a change in electrolyte volume can be detrimental as well.

== Basic designs ==
Because of this poisoning effect, two main variants of AFCs exist: static electrolyte and flowing electrolyte. Static, or immobilized, electrolyte cells of the type used in the Apollo space craft and the Space Shuttle typically use an asbestos separator saturated in potassium hydroxide. Water production is controlled by evaporation from the anode, which produces pure water that may be reclaimed for other uses. These fuel cells typically use platinum catalysts to achieve maximum volumetric and specific efficiencies.

Flowing electrolyte designs use a more open matrix that allows the electrolyte to flow either between the electrodes (parallel to the electrodes) or through the electrodes in a transverse direction (the ASK-type or EloFlux fuel cell). In parallel-flow electrolyte designs, the water produced is retained in the electrolyte, and old electrolyte may be exchanged for fresh, in a manner analogous to an oil change in a car. More space is required between electrodes to enable this flow, and this translates into an increase in cell resistance, decreasing power output compared to immobilized electrolyte designs. A further challenge for the technology is how severe the problem of permanent blocking of the cathode is by K_{2}CO_{3}; some published reports have indicated thousands of hours of operation on air. These designs have used both platinum and non-noble metal catalysts, resulting in increased efficiencies and increased cost.

The EloFlux design, with its transverse flow of electrolyte, has the advantage of low-cost construction and replaceable electrolyte but so far has only been demonstrated using oxygen.

The electrodes consist of a double layer structure: an active electrocatalyst layer and a hydrophobic layer. The active layer consists of an organic mixture which is ground and then rolled at room temperature to form a crosslinked self-supporting sheet. The hydrophobic structure prevents the electrolyte from leaking into the reactant gas flow channels and ensures diffusion of the gases to the reaction site. The two layers are then pressed onto a conducting metal mesh, and sintering completes the process.

Further variations on the alkaline fuel cell include the metal hydride fuel cell and the direct borohydride fuel cell.

== Advantages over acidic fuel cells ==
Alkaline fuel cells operate between ambient temperature and 90 °C with an electrical efficiency higher than fuel cells with acidic electrolyte, such as proton-exchange membrane fuel cells (PEMFC), solid oxide fuel cells, and phosphoric acid fuel cells. Because of the alkaline chemistry, oxygen reduction reaction (ORR) kinetics at the cathode are much more facile than in acidic cells, allowing use of non-noble metals, such as iron, cobalt, nickel, manganese, or carbon-based nanomaterial at the anode (where fuel is oxidized); and cheaper catalysts such as silver at the cathode, due to the low overpotentials associated with electrochemical reactions at high pH.

An alkaline medium also accelerates oxidation of fuels like methanol, making them more attractive. This results in less pollution compared to acidic fuel cells.

== Commercial prospects ==
AFCs are the cheapest of fuel cells to manufacture. The catalyst required for the electrodes can be any of a number of different chemicals that are inexpensive compared to those required for other types of fuel cells.

The commercial prospects for AFCs lie largely with the recently developed bi-polar plate version of this technology, considerably superior in performance to earlier mono-plate versions.

The world's first fuel-cell ship, the Hydra, used an AFC system with 5 kW net output.

Another recent development is the solid-state alkaline fuel cell, utilizing a solid anion-exchange membrane instead of a liquid electrolyte. This resolves the problem of poisoning and allows the development of alkaline fuel cells capable of running on safer hydrogen-rich carriers such as liquid urea solutions or metal amine complexes.

== See also ==
- Gas diffusion electrode
- Glossary of fuel cell terms
- Hydrazine
- Hydrogen technologies
