= Electroosmotic pump =

Device that generates flow using an electric field

An electroosmotic pump is used for generating flow or pressure by use of an electric field. One application of this is removing liquid flooding water from channels and gas diffusion layers and direct hydration of the proton exchange membrane in the membrane electrode assembly (MEA) of the proton exchange membrane fuel cells. Additionally, electroosmotic pumps have gained significant attention due to their potential applications in microfluidic channels, lab-on-a-chip devices, and biomedical engineering.

== Principle ==
Electroosmotic pumps are fabricated from silica nanospheres or hydrophilic porous glass, the pumping mechanism is generated by an external electric field applied on an electric double layer (EDL), generates high pressures (e.g., more than 340 atm (34 MPa) at 12 kV applied potentials) and high flow rates (e.g., 40 ml/min at 100 V in a pumping structure less than 1 cm^{3} in volume). EO pumps are compact, have no moving parts, and scale favorably with fuel cell design. The EO pump might drop the parasitic load of water management in fuel cells from 20% to 0.5% of the fuel cell power.

== Types ==
=== Cascaded electroosmotic pumps ===
High pressures or high flow rates are obtained by positioning several regular electroosmotic pumps in series or parallel respectively.

=== Porous electroosmotic pump ===
Pumps based on porous media can be created using sintered glass or microporous polymer membranes with appropriate surface chemistry.

=== Planar shallow electroosmotic pump ===
Planar shallow electroosmotic pumps are made of parallel shallow microchannels.

=== Electroosmotic micropumps ===
Electroosmotic effects can also be induced without external fields in order to power micron-scale motion. Bimetallic gold/silver patches have been shown to generate local fluid pumping by this mechanism when hydrogen peroxide is added to the solution. A related motion can be induced by silver phosphate particles, which can be tailored to generate reversible firework behavior among other properties. Titanium dioxide micromotors (TiO_{2}) demonstrated swarming behavior in the absence or presence of additional fuels due to the self-generated electrolyte diffusioosmosis.

== See also ==
- Capillary electrophoresis
- Electroosmotic flow
- Glossary of fuel cell terms
- Microfluidics
- Micropump
- Sol-gel
