= Direct carbon fuel cell =

Carbon rich fuel cell

A Direct Carbon Fuel Cell (DCFC) is a fuel cell that uses a carbon rich material as a fuel such as bio-mass or coal. The cell produces energy by combining carbon and oxygen, which releases carbon dioxide as a by-product. It is also called coal fuel cells (CFCs), carbon-air fuel cells (CAFCs), direct carbon/coal fuel cells (DCFCs), and DC-SOFC.

The total reaction of the cell is C + O_{2} → CO_{2}. The process in half cell notation:

- Anode: C + 2O^{2−} → CO_{2} + 4e^{−}
- Cathode: O_{2} + 4e^{−} → 2O^{2−}

Despite this release of carbon dioxide, the direct carbon fuel cell is more environmentally friendly than traditional carbon burning techniques. Due to its higher efficiency, it requires less carbon to produce the same amount of energy. Also, because pure carbon dioxide is emitted, carbon capture techniques are much cheaper than for conventional power stations. Utilized carbon can be in the form of coal, coke, char, or a non-fossilized source of carbon. At least four types of DCFC exist.

== Solid oxide fuel cell based design ==
Anode reactions:

Direct electrochemical oxidation path:

C + 2O^{2−} → CO_{2} + 4e^{−}
C + O^{2−} → CO+ 2e^{−}

Indirect electrochemical oxidation path: CO + O^{2−} → CO_{2} + 2e^{−}

Boudouard reaction (indirect chemical reaction path): C + CO_{2} → 2CO

Cathode reaction: O_{2} + 4e^{−} → 2O^{2−}

== Molten hydroxides fuel cell ==
William W. Jacques obtained US Patent 555,511 in this type of fuel cell in 1896. Prototypes have been demonstrated by the research group, SARA, Inc.

== Molten carbonate fuel cell ==
William W. Jacques obtained a Canadian patent for the molten carbonate fuel cell in 1897 It has been developed further at the Lawrence Livermore Laboratory.

== Molten tin anode ==
This design utilizes molten tin and tin oxide as an inter stage reaction between oxidation of the carbon dissolving in the anode and reduction of oxygen at the solid oxide cathode.

== See also ==
- Glossary of fuel cell terms
