= Direct borohydride fuel cell =

Subcategory of alkaline fuel cells

Direct borohydride fuel cells (DBFCs) are a subcategory of alkaline fuel cells which are directly fed by sodium borohydride or potassium borohydride as a fuel and either air/oxygen or hydrogen peroxide as the oxidant. DBFCs are relatively new types of fuel cells which are currently in the developmental stage and are attractive due to their high operating potential in relation to other type of fuel cells. Recently, DBFCs that rival proton-exchange membrane fuel cells (PEMFCs) in peak power but operating at double the voltage have been reported.

== Chemistry ==
Sodium borohydride has been used with more conventional hydrogen fuel cell systems as a means of storing hydrogen. The hydrogen can be regenerated for a fuel cell by catalytic decomposition of the borohydride with water, including successful hydration with synthetic urine:

NaBH_{4} + 2H_{2}O → NaBO_{2} + 4H_{2}

Direct borohydride fuel cells decompose and oxidize the borohydride directly, side-stepping hydrogen production and even producing slightly higher energy yields:

Cathode: 2O_{2} + 4H_{2}O + 8e^{−} → 8OH^{−} (E^{0} = +0.4V)
Anode: NaBH_{4} + 8OH^{−} → NaBO_{2} + 6H_{2}O + 8e^{−} (E^{0} = -1.24 V)

Total E^{0} = +1.64V

The simplified reaction is:

NaBH_{4} + 2O_{2} → NaBO_{2} + 2H_{2}O + Electricity

The working temperature of a direct sodium borohydride fuel cell is 70 °C (158 °F).

== Advantages ==
DBFCs could be produced more cheaply than a traditional fuel cell because they do not need expensive platinum catalysts. In addition, they have a higher power density. The high operating voltage of a DBFC reduces the number of cells (in a series circuit) needed in a stack to achieve a desired rated voltage and thus reduces the stack costs considerably.

== Disadvantages ==
Unfortunately, DBFCs do produce some hydrogen from a side reaction of NaBH_{4} with water heated by the fuel cell. This hydrogen can either be piped out to the exhaust or piped to a conventional hydrogen fuel cell. Either fuel cell will produce water, and the water can be recycled to allow for higher concentrations of NaBH_{4}.

More importantly, the process of creating electricity via a DBFC is not easily reversible. For example, after sodium borohydride (NaBH_{4}) has released its hydrogen and has been oxidized, the product is NaBO_{2} (sodium metaborate). Sodium metaborate might be hydrogenated back into sodium borohydride fuel by several different techniques, some of which might theoretically require nothing more than water and electricity or heat. However, these techniques are still in active development. As of June 30, 2010, many patents claiming to effectively achieve the conversion of sodium metaborate to sodium borohydride have been investigated but none have been confirmed—the current efficiency of "boron hydride recycling" seems to be well below 1% which is unsuitable for recharging a vehicle.

== Cost ==
Mass production projected prices for the fuel are as low as US$5/kg, rivalling the cost of hydrocarbon fuels.

== See also ==
- Glossary of fuel cell terms
