= Direct-ethanol fuel cell =

Type of fuel cell

Direct-ethanol fuel cells or DEFCs are a category of fuel cell in which ethanol is fed directly into the cell. They have been used as a model to investigate a range of fuel cell concepts including the use of PEM.

== Advantages ==
DEFC uses Ethanol in the fuel cell instead of the more toxic methanol. Ethanol is an attractive alternative to methanol because it comes with a supply chain that's already in place. Ethanol also remains the easier fuel to work with for widespread use by consumers.

Ethanol is a hydrogen-rich liquid and it has a high energy density (8.0 kWh/kg) compared to methanol (6.1 kWh/kg). Ethanol can be obtained in great quantity from biomass through a fermentation process from renewable resources like from sugar cane, wheat, corn, or even straw. Bio-generated ethanol (or bio-ethanol) is thus attractive since growing crops for biofuels absorbs much of the carbon dioxide emitted into the atmosphere from fuel used to produce the biofuels, and from burning the biofuels themselves. This is in sharp contrast to the use of fossil fuels. The use of ethanol would also overcome both the storage and infrastructure challenge of hydrogen for fuel cell applications. In a fuel cell, the oxidation of any fuel requires the use of a catalyst in order to achieve the current densities required for commercially viable fuel cells, and platinum-based catalysts are some of the most efficient materials for the oxidation of small organic molecules.

== Reaction ==
flowchart of the reaction in a DEFC

The DEFC, similar to the DMFC, relies upon the oxidation of ethanol on a catalyst layer to form carbon dioxide. Water is consumed at the anode and is produced at the cathode. Protons (H^{+}) are transported across the proton exchange membrane to the cathode where they react with oxygen to produce water. Electrons are transported through an external circuit from anode to cathode, providing power to connected devices.

The half-reactions are:

	Equation	
Anode	$\ce{{C2H5OH} + 3H2O -> 12H+ + 12e- + {2CO2}}$	oxidation
Cathode	$\ce{{3O2} + 12H+ + 12e- -> {6H2O}}$	reduction
Overall reaction	$\ce{{C2H5OH} + 3O2 -> 3H2O + {2CO2}}$	redox reaction

== Issues ==
Platinum-based catalysts are expensive, so practical exploitation of ethanol as fuel for a PEM fuel cell requires a new catalyst. New nanostructured electrocatalysts (HYPERMEC by ACTA SpA for example) have been developed, which are based on non-noble metals, preferentially mixtures of Fe, Co, Ni at the anode, and Ni, Fe or Co alone at the cathode. With ethanol, power densities as high as 140 mW/cm^{2} at 0.5 V have been obtained at 25 °C with self-breathing cells containing commercial anion exchange membranes. This catalyst does not contain any precious metals. In practice tiny metal particles are fixed onto a substrate in such a way that they produce a very active catalyst.

A polymer acts as electrolyte. The charge is carried by the hydrogen ion (proton). The liquid ethanol (C_{2}H_{5}OH) is oxidized at the anode in the presence of water, generating CO_{2}, hydrogen ions and electrons. Hydrogen ions travel through the electrolyte. They react at the cathode with oxygen from the air and the electrons from the external circuit forming water.

Bio-Ethanol based fuel cells may improve the well-to-wheel balance of this biofuel because of the increased conversion rate of the fuel cell compared to the internal combustion engine. But real world figures may be only achieved in some years since the development of direct methanol and ethanol fuel cells is lagging behind hydrogen powered fuel cells.

== Accomplishments ==
On 13 May 2007 a team from the University of Applied Sciences in Offenburg presented the world's first vehicle powered by a DEFC at Shell's Eco-marathon in France. The car "Schluckspecht" completed a successful test drive on Nogaro Circuit, powered by a DEFC stack giving an output voltage of 20 to 45 V (depending on load).

Various prototypes of Direct Ethanol Fuel Cell Stack mobile phone chargers have been built featuring voltages from 2V to 7V and powers from 800 mW to 2W were built and tested.

== See also ==
- Alkali anion exchange membrane
- Glossary of fuel cell terms
- Timeline of alcohol fuel
