= Formic acid fuel cell =

Formic acid fuel cells (direct formic acid fuel cells or DFAFCs) are a subcategory of direct liquid-feed fuel cells (DLFCs), in which the liquid fuel is directly oxidized (electrochemically) at the anode instead of reforming to produce hydrogen. Formic acid-based fuel cells represent a promising energy supply system in terms of high volumetric energy density, theoretical energy efficiency, and theoretical open-circuit voltage. They are also able to overcome certain problems inherent to traditional hydrogen (H_{2}) feed fuel cells such as safe handling, storage, and H_{2} transportation.

There are 3 main types of DFAFCs:

- Active DFAFCs, where a pump feeds the liquid fuel into the anode and oxygen in compressed air to the cathode.
- Active air-breathing DFAFCs, where the cathode is exposed to the oxygen present in ambient air.
- Passive air-breathing DFAFCs, where there are no mechanical components injecting fuels and oxygen into the cell.

The feeding of fuels and air into a cell increases its energy output, at the cost of price and size/portability.

Today, the main applications of DFAFCs include small, portable electronics, medical diagnostic devices, as well as larger fixed power applications and electric vehicles.

== Fuel sourcing ==
FA is commonly produced by reacting CO with methanol in the presence of a strong base, followed by methyl formate hydrolysis, hydrolysis of formamide, and acidolysis of formate salts. However, FA can also be sustainably produced from the direct electroreduction of CO_{2}, which neutralizes the impacts of the production of CO_{2} from the fuel cell itself, reducing the environmental impact. The reactions are as follows:

CO_{2} + 2H^{+} + 2e^{−} → HCOOH (in acidic environment)
CO_{2} + H^{+} + 2e^{−} → HCOO^{-} (in neutral/alkaline environment)

== DFAFC comparison to other energy sources ==
While several fuels were tried for DLFC, formic acid (FA) has received the most interest due to its useful characteristics, such as high volumetric energy density (53g H_{2}/L), open circuit voltage (1.48 V), high theoretical energy efficiency (58%). In addition, the storage of formic acid is easier and safer than that of pure hydrogen, and FA does not need to be kept at high pressures and/or low temperatures.

Similar to methanol, FA is a small organic molecule fed directly into the fuel cell, which removes the need for complicated catalytic reforming. However, compared to methanol, it has lower toxicity, better oxidation kinetics, and higher fuel cell efficiency, since formic acid does not cross over the polymer membrane. Because of its low cross over tendency, FA can be used at higher concentrations than methanol, mitigating the drawback of the lower volumetric energy density (4.4 kWh/dm^{3} vs 2.13 kWh/dm^{3}).

A comparison of DFAFC with pure hydrogen cells, methanol cells, and gasoline for several characteristics is reported in the table below:

Fuel	Price (US$/kg)	Energy Density (kWh/dm^{3})	Operating Temperature (°C)	Storage Pressure (bar)
FA	0.7	2.13	20 - 60 (DFAFC)	
H_{2}	2.6 - 5.1	0.53	150 - 200 (AFC)	700
Methanol	0.2 - 0.4	4.4 - 4.9	30 - 90 (DMFC)	
Gasoline	2.5 - 3.5 (US$/Gallon)	13		

== FA safety concerns ==
Formic acid in 85% concentration is flammable, and diluted formic acid is on the U.S. Food and Drug Administration list of food additives. The principal danger from formic acid is from skin or eye contact with the concentrated liquid or vapors.

== Reactions ==
DFAFCs convert formic acid and oxygen into carbon dioxide and water to produce energy. Formic acid oxidation occurs at the anode on a catalyst layer. Carbon dioxide is formed and protons (H^{+}) are passed through the polymer membrane to react with oxygen on a catalyst layer located at the cathode. Electrons are passed through an external circuit from anode to cathode to provide power to an external device.

The direct anode, cathode, and net reactions of DFAFC are reported below:

Anode: HCOOH → CO_{2} + 2 H^{+} + 2 e^{−}
E^{0} = -0.25V (vs SHE)
Cathode: 1/2O_{2} + 2 H^{+} + 2 e^{−} → H_{2}O
E^{0} = 1.23V (vs SHE)
Net reaction: HCOOH + 1/2 O_{2} → CO_{2} + H_{2}O
E^{0} = 1.48V (vs SHE)

== Alternative reactive pathways ==
While the mechanism of reaction reported in the above section is commonly used for simple explicative purposes, the chemical pathways are actually more complicated, and are at the center of most of the research on DFAFCs to optimize their efficiency. The detrimental effect and poisoning caused by certain pathways can be mitigated by the use of catalysts with proper shape and morphology, such as Pt and/or Pt alloys.

=== Cathode ===
The oxygen reduction reaction (ORR) occurring at the cathode has been investigated. It can occur via two different pathways: one involving the transfer of four electrons and the other two. The former results in the formation of water (H_{2}O), while the latter generates hydrogen peroxide (H_{2}O_{2}). Hydrogen peroxide radicals have deleterious effects on the membrane separator, and therefore its formation should be tentatively avoided.

=== Anode ===
The mechanism for formic acid electrooxidation (FAEO) at the anode has been investigated for almost half a century without resolution. While the details are still being debated, a mechanism for FAEO in which the oxidation mechanism consisted of two parallel paths is generally accepted. The direct pathway occurs via the dehydrogenation reaction of HCOOH, while the indirect pathway proceeds by the dehydration reaction to form adsorbed CO as an intermediate, which then is oxidized to CO_{2}.

Direct pathway: HCOOH → Active intermediate → CO_{2} + 2H^{+} + 2e^{−}

Indirect pathway: HCOOH → CO_{ads} + H_{2}O → CO_{2} + 2H^{+} + 2e^{−}

The indirect oxidation pathway occurs via dehydration reaction and temporarily forms the poisoning intermediate COads, which reduces the efficiency of the fuel cell.

== Catalysts used in DFAFC ==
=== Cathode ===
The important characteristics for a DFAFC catalyst at the cathode are mainly high activity toward ORR and tolerance to FA, in order to prevent the cell's drop in efficiency following possible FA cross over. The material of choice is platinum (Pt) on top of composite substrates such as TiO_{2}/C and CNx nanofibers. Alternative catalysts include iridium (Ir) and Ir alloys, together with cobalt (Co) and iron (Fe) deposited on nitrogen-doped carbon nanotubes (CNTs).

=== Anode ===
Platinum (Pt) and palladium (Pd)-based catalysts are two prominent anode options for DFAFC.

The surface morphology of the platinum particles has an effect on the reaction, as steps and terraces favor the desirable direct pathway, while flat particles result in the indirect (undesirable) pathway taking place.

In general, Pd catalysts have higher CO tolerance, are faster at catalyzing FA into carbon dioxide, and their power density is higher than their Pt counterparts. Their drawback is the formation of agglomerates and its quick loss of function.

== History ==
During previous investigations, researchers dismissed formic acid as a practical fuel because of the high overpotential shown by experiments: this meant the reaction appeared to be too difficult to be practical. However, in 2005 - 2006, other researchers (in particular Richard Masel's group at the University of Illinois at Urbana-Champaign) found that the reason for the low performance was the usage of platinum as a catalyst, as it is common in most other types of fuel cells. Using palladium instead, they claim to have obtained better performance than equivalent direct methanol fuel cells. As of April 2006, Tekion held the exclusive license to DFAFC fuel cell technology using PEM membranes and formic-acid fuel from the University of Illinois at Urbana-Champaign, and with an investment from Motorola, was partnering with BASF to design and manufacture power packs by late 2007, but development appears to have stalled, and almost all information was removed from Tekion's website before April 24, 2010.

Neah Power Systems, Inc. and Silent Falcon UAS Technologies worked together to integrate formic acid reformer fuel cell technology into the Silent Falcon's unmanned aerial system (UAS), aka "drone".

In 2018, work was published addressing the issue of requiring a high overpotential by way of golden single-atom-site platinum catalysts.

== See also ==
- Glossary of fuel cell terms
- Portable fuel cell applications
