= Membrane electrode assembly =

Part of a PEM fuel cell

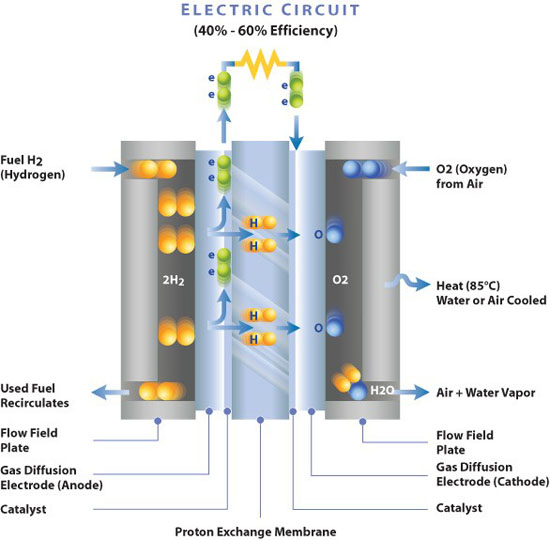
Electro-chemical reaction Diagram of PEM MEA

A membrane electrode assembly (MEA) is an assembled stack of proton-exchange membranes (PEM) or alkali anion exchange membrane (AAEM), catalyst and flat plate electrode used in fuel cells and electrolyzers.

== PEM-MEA ==
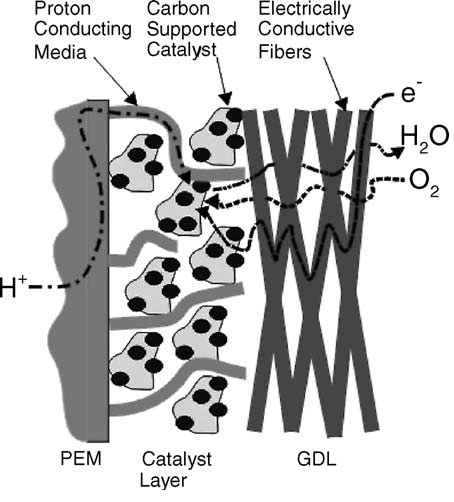
Transport of Gases, p+ and e- in PEMFC

The PEM is sandwiched between two electrodes which have the catalyst embedded in them. The electrodes are electrically insulated from each other by the PEM. These two electrodes make up the anode and cathode respectively.

The PEM is typically a fluoropolymer (PFSA) proton permeable electrical insulator barrier. Hydrocarbon variants are currently being developed and are expected to succeed fluoropolymers. This barrier allows the transport of the protons from the anode to the cathode through the membrane but forces the electrons to travel around a conductive path to the cathode. The most commonly used Nafion PEMs are Nafion XL, 112, 115, 117, and 1110.

The electrodes are heat pressed onto the PEM. Commonly used materials for these electrodes are carbon cloth or carbon fiber papers. NuVant produces a carbon cloth called ELAT which maximizes gas transport to the PEM as well as moves water vapor away from the PEM. Imbedding ELAT with noble metal catalyst allows this carbon cloth to also act as the electrode. Many other different methods and procedures also exist for the production of MEAs which are quite similar between fuel cells and electrolyzers.

Platinum is one of the most commonly used catalysts, however other platinum group metals are also used. Ruthenium and platinum are often used together, if carbon monoxide (CO) is a product of the electro-chemical reaction as CO poisons the PEM and impacts the efficiency of the fuel cell. Due to the high cost of these and other similar materials, research is being undertaken to develop catalysts that use lower cost materials as the high costs are still a hindering factor in the widespread economical acceptance of fuel cell technology.

Current service life is 7,300 hours under cycling conditions, while at the same time reducing platinum group metal loading to 0.2 mg/cm2.

== Production ==
At this time most companies manufacturing MEAs specialize solely in high volume production, such as W. L. Gore & Associates, Johnson Matthey, and 3M. However, there are other companies which produce MEAs, allowing different shapes, catalysts or membranes to be evaluated as well, which include Fuel Cell Store, FuelCellsEtc, and many others.

== See also ==
- Electrochemical hydrogen compressor
- Electroosmotic pump
- Gas diffusion electrode
- Glossary of fuel cell terms
- Microelectrode array
