= Protonic ceramic fuel cell =

Scheme of a proton conducting fuel cell

A protonic ceramic fuel cell (PCFC) is a fuel cell based around a ceramic, solid, electrolyte material as the proton conductor from anode to cathode. These fuel cells produce electricity by removing an electron from a hydrogen atom, pushing the charged hydrogen atom through the ceramic membrane, and returning the electron to the hydrogen on the other side of the ceramic membrane during a reaction with oxygen. The reaction of many proposed fuels in PCFCs produces electricity and heat, the latter keeping the device at a suitable temperature. Efficient proton conductivity through most discovered ceramic electrolyte materials requires elevated operational temperatures around 400-700 degrees Celsius, however intermediate temperature (200-400 degrees Celsius) ceramic fuel cells and lower temperature alternative are an active area of research. In addition to hydrogen gas, the ability to operate at intermediate and high temperatures enables the use of a variety of liquid hydrogen carrier fuels, including: ammonia, and methane. The technology shares the thermal and kinetic advantages of high temperature molten carbonate and solid oxide fuel cells, while exhibiting all of the intrinsic benefits of proton conduction in proton-exchange membrane fuel cells (PEMFC) and phosphoric acid fuel cells (PAFC). PCFCs exhaust water at the cathode and unused fuel, fuel reactant products and fuel impurities at the anode. Common chemical compositions of the ceramic membranes are barium zirconate (BaZrO_{3}), barium cerate (BaCeO_{3}), caesium dihydrogen phosphate (CsH_{2}PO_{4}), and complex solid solutions of those materials with other ceramic oxides. The acidic oxide ceramics are sometimes broken into their own class of protonic ceramic fuel cells termed "solid acid fuel cells".

Some PCFCs operate at high enough temperatures that fuels can be electrochemically oxidized at the anode, not needing the intermediate step of producing hydrogen through a reforming process. In this setting, gaseous molecules of the hydrocarbon fuel are absorbed on the surface of the anode in the presence of water vapor, with carbon dioxide as the primary reaction product; hydrogen atoms are efficiently stripped off to be turned into H+ ions then moving into the electrolyte to the other side (cathode) where they react with oxygen in the air to produce water. Other PCFCs operate at lower temperatures and utilize chemical catalysts in addition to electrochemical catalysts to produce hydrogen for the reduction reaction.

== Mechanical stability ==
Characterizing the mechanical properties of PCFCs is an active area of research. One simple method to improve mechanical stability is through the introduction of sintering additives, like zinc oxide (ZnO). By including ZnO in the sintering of yttrium-doped barium zirconate (BZY), the sintering temperature was reduce to 1300 °C and greater than 93% theoretical densification occurred. The current mechanism for increased densification is unknown but is likely due to the creation of a secondary ZnO phase or the partial substitution of Zr^{4+} onto Zn or Y sites. Unfortunately, ZnO sintering additives have been found to significantly reduce the proton conductivity of BZY, creating a need for further investigation of potential sintering additives.

Crack formation within PCFC materials can drastically reduce the durability of the cell and in extreme cases lead to complete failure. Therefore, the thermal expansion coefficients (TECs) of each material should be considered as a large mismatch will create cracks. In fact, Irvine et al. has produced a PCFC using BaCe_{0.7}Zr_{0.1}Y_{0.15}Zn_{0.05}O_{3−δ}(BCZYZn05) in the anode, cathode, and electrolyte to improve thermal expansion matching. As a proton conductor, BCZYZn05 can be used throughout the cell without inducing parasitic electronic leakage while providing a supportive backbone throughout the cell. Using nano-indentation, the use of BCZYZn05 was found to increase the hardness of the fuel cell components while maintaining necessary electrochemical reactivity and conductivity.

The atmospheric conditions used throughout processing can also lead to crack formation. If a BZY electrolyte is exposed to humid gases during fabrication, water will incorporate into the material. To mitigate the compressive stress caused by water uptake, the hydration of BZY should be performed at high temperatures. Cracks may not appear during processing and can occur during storage. This has been reported for electrochemical cells using BaCe_{0.2}Zr_{0.7}Y_{0.1}O_{3−δ} as an electrolyte. Here, the cracks were prevent by exposing the cell to a reducing environment immediately after sinter, reducing the TEC mismatch between the electrode supports and the electrolyte.

== Applications and commercial development ==
PCFCs operating at intermediate temperature of 200 - 400 degrees Celsius have been proposed for heavy duty trucking. Remote power applications using PCFCs have been demonstrated at Canadian oil wells.

== See also ==
- Glossary of fuel cell terms
- Hydrogen technologies
