= Reaction inhibitor =

Substance that inhibits a chemical reaction

A reaction inhibitor is a substance that decreases the rate of, or prevents, a chemical reaction. A catalyst or an Enzyme activator, in contrast, is a substance that increases the rate of a chemical reaction.

== Examples ==
- Added acetanilide slows the decomposition of drug-store hydrogen peroxide solution, inhibiting the reaction

2H_{2}O_{2} → 2H_{2}O + O_{2}, which is catalyzed by heat, light, and impurities.

== Inhibition of a catalyst ==
An inhibitor can reduce the effectiveness of a catalyst in a catalysed reaction (either a non-biological catalyst or an enzyme). E.g., if a compound is so similar to (one of) the reactants that it can bind to the active site of a catalyst but does not undergo a catalytic reaction then that catalyst molecule cannot perform its job because the active site is occupied. When the inhibitor is released, the catalyst is again available for reaction.

== Inhibition and catalyst poisoning ==
Inhibition should be distinguished from catalyst poisoning. An inhibitor only hinders the working of a catalyst without changing it, whilst in catalyst poisoning the catalyst undergoes a chemical reaction that is irreversible in the environment in question (the active catalyst may only be regained by a separate process).

== Potency ==
Index inhibitors or simplified as inhibitor predictably inhibit metabolism via a given pathway and are commonly used in prospective clinical drug-drug interaction studies.

Inhibitors of CYP can be classified by their potency, such as:

- Strong inhibitor being one that causes at least a 5-fold increase in the plasma AUC values, or more than 80% decrease in clearance of substrates ( Over 1.8 times slower than usual clearance rate.) .
- Moderate inhibitor being one that causes at least a 2-fold increase in the plasma AUC values, or 50-80% decrease in clearance of substrates ( At least 1.5-1.8 times slower than usual clearance speed.) .
- Weak inhibitor being one that causes at least a 1.25-fold but less than 2-fold increase in the plasma AUC values, or 20-50% decrease in clearance of substrates ( At least 1.2-1.5 times slower than usual clearance rate.) .

== See also ==
- Enzyme inhibition
- Catalyst poisoning
