= Ionomer =

Polymer containing many ionic or ionizable functional groups

An example of an ionomer, with carboxylate groups bound to a zinc cation

An ionomer (/ˌaɪˈɑːnəmər/) (iono- + -mer) is a polymer composed of repeat units of both electrically neutral repeating units and ionized units covalently bonded to the polymer backbone as pendant group moieties. Usually no more than 15 mole percent are ionized. The ionized units are often carboxylic acid groups.

The classification of a polymer as an ionomer depends on the level of substitution of ionic groups as well as how the ionic groups are incorporated into the polymer structure. For example, polyelectrolytes also have ionic groups covalently bonded to the polymer backbone, but have a much higher ionic group molar substitution level (usually greater than 80%); ionenes are polymers where ionic groups are part of the actual polymer backbone. These two classes of ionic-group-containing polymers have vastly different morphological and physical properties and are therefore not considered ionomers.

Ionomers have unique physical properties including electrical conductivity and viscosity—increase in ionomer solution viscosity with increasing temperatures (see conducting polymer). Ionomers also have unique morphological properties as the non-polar polymer backbone is energetically incompatible with the polar ionic groups. As a result, the ionic groups in most ionomers will undergo microphase separation to form ionic-rich domains.

Commercial applications for ionomers include golf ball covers, semipermeable membranes, sealing tape and thermoplastic elastomers. Common examples of ionomers include polystyrene sulfonate, Nafion and Hycar.

IUPAC definition

Ionomer: A polymer composed of ionomer molecules.

Ionomer molecule: A macromolecule in which a small but
significant proportion of the constitutional units have ionizable
or ionic groups, or both.

Note: Some protein molecules may be classified as ionomer
molecules.

== Synthesis ==
Usually ionomer synthesis consists of two steps – the introduction of acid groups to the polymer backbone and the neutralization of some of the acid groups by a metal cation. In very rare cases, the groups introduced are already neutralized by a metal cation. The first step (introduction of acid groups) can be done in two ways; a neutral non-ionic monomer can be copolymerized with a monomer that contains pendant acid groups or acid groups can be added to a non-ionic polymer through post-reaction modifications. For example, ethylene-methacrylic acid and sulfonated perfluorocarbon (Nafion) are synthesized through copolymerization while polystyrene sulfonate is synthesized through post-reaction modifications.

In most cases, the acid form of the copolymer is synthesized (i.e. 100% of the carboxylic acid groups are neutralized by hydrogen cations) and the ionomer is formed through subsequent neutralization by the appropriate metal cation. The identity of the neutralizing metal cation has an effect on the physical properties of the ionomer; the most commonly used metal cations (at least in academic research) are zinc, sodium, and magnesium. Neutralization or ionomerization, can also be accomplished in two ways: the acid copolymer can be melt-mixed with a basic metal or neutralization can be achieved through solution processes. The former method is preferred commercially. However, as commercial manufacturers are reluctant to share their procedures, little is known about the exact conditions of the melt-mixing neutralization process other than that hydroxides are generally used to provide the metal cation. The latter solution neutralization process is generally used in academic settings. The acid copolymer is dissolved and a basic salt with the appropriate metal cation is added to this solution. Where dissolution of the acid copolymer is difficult, simply swelling the polymer in the solvent is sufficient, though dissolving is always preferred. Because basic salts are polar and are not soluble in the non-polar solvents used to dissolve most polymers, mixed solvents (e.g. 90:10 toluene/alcohol) are often used.

Neutralization level must be determined after an ionomer is synthesized as varying the neutralization level varies the morphological and physical properties of the ionomer. One method used to do this is to examine the peak heights of infrared vibrations of the acid form. However, there may be substantial error in determining peak height, especially since small amounts of water appear in the same wavenumber range. Titration of the acid groups is another method that can be used, though this is not possible in some systems.

== Surlyn ==
Surlyn is the brand name of an ionomer resin created by DuPont, a copolymer of ethylene and methacrylic acid used as a coating and packaging material. DuPont neutralizes the acid with NaOH, yielding the sodium salt. Crystals of ethylene-methacrylic acid ionomers exhibit dual melting behavior.

== Application ==
- Golf Ball Covers: Ionomers are widely used to make golf ball covers. They are essential for these covers because they have impact resistance, toughness, and durability. The ionic crosslinks in the polymer structure allow the material to withstand the high forces of a golf swing. It keeps its shape and performance over time. The resilience from the ionic clusters helps the ball maintain its flight characteristics. This ensures the ball has a longer lifespan. Additionally, the material's excellent abrasion resistance reduces surface wear. This allows for consistent performance across many rounds of play.
- Packaging Films: In the packaging industry, ionomers are prized for their combination of optical clarity, toughness, and sealing properties. They can form strong, heat-sealable bonds. This makes them ideal for food packaging films. Both durability and transparency are important for these films. The films can protect the contents from external contaminants. They also provide a clear view of the product, enhancing consumer appeal. Additionally, ionomers are resistant to punctures and tears. This ensures that the packaging remains intact during transportation and handling. Furthermore, ionomers are resistant to oils and fats. This makes them particularly useful in packaging greasy or oily foods. The packaging maintains its integrity without degradation.
- Semipermeable Membranes: Ionomers are used to make semipermeable membranes. These membranes are used in applications that require selective ion transport. This includes fuel cells and water purification systems. The ionic domains in the ionomer structure allow ions to pass through selectively. They block other molecules. This makes ionomers ideal for use in proton exchange membranes (PEMs) in fuel cells. This selective ion transport is crucial for the efficiency and effectiveness of these devices. It allows for controlled chemical reactions and energy production. In water purification, ionomer-based membranes can selectively remove contaminants. They allow pure water to pass through. This contributes to safe and efficient filtration processes.
- Adhesives and Sealants: Ionomers have strong adhesive properties and are flexible. That's why they are used in adhesives and sealants. Ionomers can form strong bonds with different materials like metals, plastics, and glass. This makes them suitable for use in automotive, construction, and consumer goods. In sealants, ionomers provide excellent resistance to environmental factors like moisture and temperature changes. This ensures long-lasting performance even in harsh conditions. Ionomers maintain their flexibility, which is important in applications where materials expand or have mechanical stress.
- Thermoplastic Elastomers: Ionomers are used as thermoplastic elastomers (TPEs). Their elasticity and ability to be remolded without significant degradation are advantageous. These materials can be stretched and deformed. They can return to their original shape when the stress is released. This makes them useful in applications requiring both flexibility and strength. TPEs based on ionomers are found in a wide range of products. These include footwear and medical devices. In these products, comfort, durability, and resilience are critical. Long-term exposure to the elements is a concern in outdoor applications due to poor resistance to UV amongst other usual concerns.
- Coatings and Paints: Ionomers are used in coatings and paints. Their adhesion properties and resistance to environmental damage make surfaces more durable. In automotive and industrial coatings, ionomers create protective layers. These layers resist corrosion, abrasion, and chemical exposure. Ionomers can form smooth, uniform coatings. This makes them suitable for applications needing both aesthetic and functional surface protection. Additionally, ionomer-based coatings have self-healing properties. Small scratches can be repaired through thermal treatment. This extends the lifespan of coated products and reduces maintenance costs.
- Biomedical Applications: Ionomers have potential applications in the biomedical field. They can be used in drug delivery systems and medical implants. Ionomers are biocompatible. They can interact with biological tissues. This makes them suitable for devices that require controlled release of drugs. They are also suitable for devices that need to integrate with living tissue. Research is ongoing to explore the use of ionomers in innovative medical applications. Their unique properties could offer new solutions for healthcare challenges. For example, ionomer-based drug delivery systems can provide targeted therapy. They can control the release rate of medications. This can improve the efficacy and reduce the side effects of treatments.
- Ion-Exchange Resins: Ionomers are used to make ion-exchange resins. These resins are important for water treatment and purification. The resins are made from ionomer materials. The resins can selectively exchange ions in a solution. This allows them to remove unwanted contaminants like heavy metals. They can also soften water by exchanging calcium and magnesium ions with sodium or potassium ions. Ionomer-based resins are stable and durable. This makes them suitable for repeated use in industrial and household water treatment systems.
- Electrochemical Devices: In electrochemical devices, ionomers play a crucial role as solid electrolytes. Ionomers can conduct ions while acting as an insulating barrier for electrons. This makes them ideal for use in batteries, supercapacitors, and fuel cells. The ionomers' stability under electrochemical conditions ensures long-term performance and efficiency in these devices. In fuel cells, ionomers are used in the membrane electrode assembly (MEA). In the MEA, ionomers facilitate the transport of protons from the anode to the cathode. This enables the generation of electricity.

== See also ==
- Nafion
- Polyelectrolyte
