= Francis Thomas Bacon =

English engineer (1904–1992)

Francis Thomas "Tom" Bacon OBE FREng FRS (21 December 1904 – 24 May 1992) was an English engineer who in 1932 developed the first practical hydrogen–oxygen fuel cell. It is used to generate power for space capsules and satellites.

Bacon was awarded an OBE by Queen Elizabeth II in the 1967 New Year Honours. In 1976, Bacon was a founder fellow of the Fellowship of Engineering (now the Royal Academy of Engineering), the United Kingdom's national academy of engineering.

== Life and works ==
Francis Thomas Bacon was born in 1904 at Ramsden Hall, Billericay, Essex, England. An engineer at Trinity College, Cambridge, in 1932 he developed the fuel cell which was used as part of the Apollo moon project in the 1960s. Fuel cells were first demonstrated by Sir William Robert Grove in 1839, but his invention lay largely dormant for over 100 years until it was revived by Bacon. The alkaline fuel cell (AFC), also known as the Bacon fuel cell after its inventor, has been used in NASA space programs since the mid-1960s to generate power for satellites and space capsules. The U.S. President Richard Nixon welcomed Bacon to the White House, and told him; "Without you Tom, we wouldn't have gotten to the moon.” After the successful lunar landing of Apollo 11 in July 1969, Tom and his wife Barbara met astronauts Neil Armstrong, Buzz Aldrin and Michael Collins at a reception hosted by British Prime Minister Harold Wilson at 10 Downing Street.

Bacon was a descendant of the family of the philosopher Sir Francis Bacon (who had no children), and he was educated at Eton College and Trinity College, Cambridge. After Cambridge he became an apprentice with the Newcastle engineering firm owned by Sir Charles Parsons, and was strongly influenced by him.

The principle of the fuel cell had been demonstrated by Sir William Grove in 1839 and other investigators had experimented with various forms of fuel cell. However unlike previous workers in the field, Bacon was an engineer and he was comfortable working with machinery operating at high temperatures and pressures. He initially experimented with Grove's use of activated platinum gauze with a sulphuric acid electrolyte, but quickly moved on to use activated nickel electrodes with an aqueous potassium hydroxide electrolyte. In January 1940, he moved to a laboratory at King's College London and there developed a double cell, with one unit for generating the hydrogen and oxygen gases and the other for the fuel cell proper. This could be reversed so that it acted as both an electrolyser and a fuel cell. Problems were encountered due to the high operating temperatures and pressures and the corrosive nature of the chemicals.

In 1946, under new funding arrangements, the work moved to the Department of Colloid Science at Cambridge University. There Bacon's team were shown a sample of porous nickel sheet whose origins were so obscure they were protected by the Official Secrets Act. They used this sheet to develop electrodes with large pores on the gas side and finer ones on the electrolyte side, which created a much more stable interface than had existed previously.

As funding levels increased the apparatus was moved again to what was then the Department of Chemical Engineering. There the team overcame problems of corrosion of the oxygen electrode by soaking the new nickel electrodes in lithium hydroxide solution followed by drying and heating. In 1959, with support from Marshall of Cambridge Ltd. (later Marshall Aerospace) a 5 kW forty-cell battery, with an operating efficiency of 60%, was demonstrated publicly.

The patents for the fuel cell were licensed by Pratt and Whitney as part of a successful bid to provide electrical power for the Apollo program to land man on the moon. The fuel cells were ideal in this regard because they have rising efficiency with decreasing load, unlike heat engines. Hydrogen and oxygen gases were already on board the ship for propulsion and life support, and the by-product water could be used for drinking and humidifying the atmosphere of the capsule.

Towards the later part of his life, Bacon was a consultant for the engineering firm Energy Conversion Limited and Johnson Matthey. He was a Founder Fellow of the Fellowship of Engineering and the first Honorary Member of the European Fuel Cell Group.

== See also ==
- Daniel Davis Jr. - electrical device inventor
- Timeline of hydrogen technologies
- Fuel Cell
