= Mean time between outages =

In a system the mean time between outages (MTBO) is the mean time between equipment failures that result in loss of system continuity or unacceptable degradation.

The MTBO is calculated by the equation,

$MTBO = \frac{MTBF}{1-FFAS}$

where MTBF is the nonredundant mean time between failures and FFAS is the fraction of failures for which the failed equipment is automatically bypassed.
