= Catalyst poisoning =

Chemical deactivation of a catalyst

Catalyst poisoning is the partial or total deactivation of a catalyst by a chemical compound. Poisoning refers specifically to chemical deactivation, rather than other mechanisms of catalyst degradation such as thermal decomposition or physical damage. Although usually undesirable, poisoning may be helpful when it results in improved catalyst selectivity (e.g. Lindlar's catalyst). An important historic example was the poisoning of catalytic converters by leaded fuel.

== Poisoning of Pd catalysts ==
Organic functional groups and inorganic anions often have the ability to strongly adsorb to metal surfaces. Common catalyst poisons include carbon monoxide, halides, cyanides, sulfides, sulfites, phosphates, phosphites and organic molecules such as nitriles, nitro compounds, oximes, and nitrogen-containing heterocycles. Agents vary their catalytic properties because of the nature of the transition metal. Lindlar catalysts are prepared by the reduction of palladium chloride in a slurry of calcium carbonate (CaCO_{3}) followed by poisoning with lead acetate. In a related case, the Rosenmund reduction of acyl halides to aldehydes, the palladium catalyst (over barium sulfate or calcium carbonate) is intentionally poisoned by the addition of sulfur or quinoline in order to lower the catalyst activity and thereby prevent over-reduction of the aldehyde product to the primary alcohol.

== Poisoning process ==
Poisoning often involves compounds that chemically bond to a catalyst's active sites. Poisoning decreases the number of active sites, and the average distance that a reactant molecule must diffuse through the pore structure before undergoing reaction increases as a result. As a result, poisoned sites can no longer alter the rate of reaction. Large scale production of substances such as ammonia in the Haber–Bosch process include steps to remove potential poisons from the product stream. When the poisoning reaction rate is slow relative to the rate of diffusion, the poison will be evenly distributed throughout the catalyst and will result in homogeneous poisoning of the catalyst. Conversely, if the reaction rate is fast compared to the rate of diffusion, a poisoned shell will form on the exterior layers of the catalyst, a situation known as "pore-mouth" poisoning, and the rate of catalytic reaction may become limited by the rate of diffusion through the inactive shell. Homogenous and "pore-mouth" poisoning occurrences are most frequently observed when using a porous medium catalyst.

== Selective poisoning ==
If the catalyst and reaction conditions are indicative of low effectiveness, selective poisoning may be observed, where poisoning of only a small fraction of the catalyst's surface gives a disproportionately large drop in activity.

If η is the effectiveness factor of the poisoned surface and h_{p} is the Thiele modulus for the poisoned case:

$$\eta =\frac{\tanh h_{\rm p}}{h_{\rm p}}$$

When the ratio of the reaction rates of the poisoned pore to the unpoisoned pore is considered:

$$F =\sqrt{1-\alpha}\, \tanh \left (h_{\rm T}  \sqrt{1-\alpha} \right) \coth h_{\rm T}$$

where F is the ratio of poisoned to unpoisoned pores, h_{T} is the Thiele modulus for the unpoisoned case, and α is the fraction of the surface that is poisoned.

The above equation simplifies depending on the value of h_{T}. When the surface is available, h_{T} is negligible:

$$F = 1 - \alpha$$

This represents the "classical case" of nonselective poisoning where the fraction of the activity remaining is equal to the fraction of the unpoisoned surface remaining.

When h_{T} is very large, it becomes:

$$F = \sqrt{1- \alpha}$$

In this case, the catalyst effectiveness factors are considerably less than unity, and the effects of the portion of the poison adsorbed near the closed end of the pore are not as apparent as when h_{T} is small.

The rate of diffusion of the reactant through the poisoned region is equal to the rate of reaction and is given by:

$$\vec{v}_{\rm diffusion} = -\pi  \langle r^2 \rangle  D  \vec{\nabla} c$$

And the rate of reaction within a pore is given by:

$$v = \eta \pi \langle r \rangle (1-\alpha)  \langle L \rangle k_1'' c_{\rm c}$$

The fraction of the catalyst surface available for reaction can be obtained from the ratio of the poisoned reaction rate to the unpoisoned reaction rate:

$$\begin{align}
F &= \frac{v_{\rm poisoned}}{v_{\rm unpoisoned}} \\
&= \frac{\tanh[(1-\alpha)  h_{\rm T}]\coth h_{\rm T}}{1 + \alpha h_{\rm T}  \tanh[(1-\alpha) h_{\rm T}]}
\end{align}$$

== Benefits of selective poisoning ==
Usually, catalyst poisoning is undesirable as it leads to the wasting of expensive metals or their complexes. However, poisoning of catalysts can be used to improve selectivity of reactions. Poisoning can allow for selective intermediates to be isolated and desirable final products to be produced.

== Hydrodesulfurization catalysts ==
In the purification of petroleum products, the process of hydrodesulfurization is utilized. Thiols, such as thiophene, are reduced using H_{2} to produce H_{2}S and hydrocarbons of varying chain length. Common catalysts used are tungsten and molybdenum sulfide. Adding cobalt and nickel to either edges or partially incorporating them into the crystal lattice structure can improve the catalyst's efficiency. The synthesis of the catalyst creates a supported hybrid that prevents poisoning of the cobalt nuclei.

=== Other examples ===
- In catalytic converters used on automobiles, the combustion of leaded gasoline produces elemental lead, lead(II) oxide, lead(II) chloride, and lead(II) bromide. Lead alloys with the metals present in the catalyst, while lead oxides and halides coat the catalyst's surfaces, reducing the converter's ability to reduce NOx emissions.
- In fuel cells using platinum catalysts, the fuels must be free of sulfur and carbon monoxide, unless a desulfurization system is used.
- Ziegler-Natta catalysts for the production of polyolefins (e.g. polyethylene, polypropylene, etc.) are poisoned by water and oxygen. This poisoning applies to both homogeneous catalysts and heterogeneous catalysts for olefin polymerization. This requires the monomers (ethylene, propylene, etc.) to be purified.

== See also ==
- Hydrogen purity
- Reaction inhibitor
- Enzyme inhibitor
