= High Temperature Proton Exchange Membrane fuel cell =

Type of electrochemical capable of generating fuel through proton exchange

High Temperature Proton Exchange Membrane fuel cells (HT-PEMFC), also known as High Temperature Polymer Electrolyte Membrane fuel cells, are a type of PEM fuel cells which can be operated at temperatures between 120 and 200 °C. HT-PEM fuel cells are used for both stationary and portable applications.

== Science ==
=== Overview ===
The HT-PEM fuel cell was developed in 1995 for operation at higher cell temperatures aiming at lower sensitivity of PEM fuel cells regarding impurities. Thus HT-PEM fuel cell technology is one of the youngest fuel cell types and HT-PEM fuel cell systems have been produced since the early 21st century by several companies.

The membrane consists of an acid and temperature resistant polymer which has the ability to uptake acid which acts as electrolyte. Commonly polybenzimidazole (PBI) is used as a membrane and Phosphoric acid is used as an electrolyte. The HT-PEM fuel cell technology is similar to Phosphoric Acid Fuel Cell (PAFC), but mainly differs in the membrane which is used in HT-PEM fuel cell and makes portable applications possible for HT-PEM fuel cells.

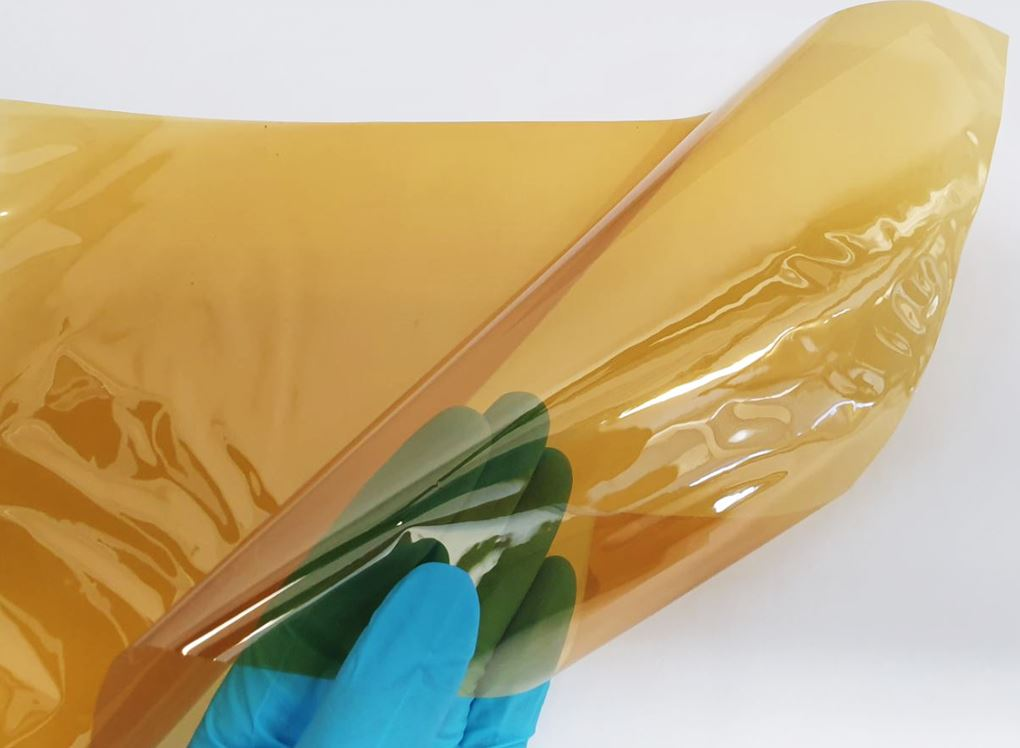
Phosphoric acid doped PBI membrane for HT-PEM fuel cell

Whereas the common PEM fuel cell, also called Low Temperature Proton Exchange Membrane fuel cell (LT-PEM), must usually be operated with hydrogen with high purity of more than 99.9% the HT-PEM fuel cell is less sensitive to impurities and thus is typically operated with reformate gas with hydrogen concentration of about 50 to 75%. In contrast to LT-PEM fuel cell, which is sensitive to carbon monoxide concentration of several parts per million, HT-PEM fuel cells are operated at carbon monoxide concentrations up to about 3 Vol-%. Usually HT-PEM fuel cells are operated at cell temperature of 150 to 180 °C.

The low sensitivity to impurities allows the use of fuels like methanol, ethanol, natural gas, LPG, DME, etc. which are reformed in a reformer to hydrogen rich reformate gas. Without the need for purification, the fuel cell system design is simplified.

The low sensitivity to impurities and membrane proton conductivity allow the Membrane electrode assembly, used for HT-PEM fuel cell, to also be used for hydrogen separation, separating ultrapure hydrogen efficiently from diluted or impure hydrogen containing gases.

The balance-of-plant system efficiency for methanol fueled HT-PEM fuel cell systems is typically between 35 and 45% and can reach up to about 55% depending on system design and operating conditions. Cell efficiency of up to 63% can be reached.

As the steam reforming of methanol is simpler and more efficient (catalyst bed temperature below 280 °C) compared to reforming of other fuels, with low cost, simple storage and high purity of conventional methanol and renewable methanol (e.g. made from waste or renewable power), most HT-PEM fuel cells are operated with methanol. The methanol fueled HT-PEM fuel cell is the mostly used type of Reformed Methanol fuel cell (RMFC).

=== Strengths ===
- No water management for humidification of the membrane is needed compared to LT-PEM fuel cell.
- Waste heat of the stack (130 to 180 °C) can be used making combined heat and power (CHP) possible for further usage of the heat in contrast to LT-PEM fuel cell which has too low waste heat temperature below 80 °C.
- Simple cooling of stack is possible because of higher stack temperature compared to LT-PEM fuel cell (heat exchange surface, cooling power).
- Various fuels which can be reformed in a reformer to hydrogen rich gas can be used (e.g. methanol, ethanol, propanol, bio-butanol, bio-glycerol, methane, ethane, propane, butane, OME, gasoline, ammonia).
- Simple system design is possible as no purification step for methanol fueled HT-PEM fuel cells is needed.
- Use of plastic components and elastomer seals in the stack is possible in contrast to SOFC fuel cells.
- Higher system efficiency of methanol fueled HT-PEM fuel cell systems (35 to 45%) compared to Direct Methanol Fuel Cell, DMFC (20 to 30%). Low methanol fuel consumption.
- No need for high methanol fuel purity for methanol fueled HT-PEM fuel cell system compared to DMFC.
- Higher lifetime of methanol fueled HT-PEM fuel cell system than for DMFC system is possible.
- Pure fuels or water-fuel mixtures are applicable (depending on fuel cell system design).
- Use of renewable fuels is possible.
- Cold storage temperatures below 0 °C are no problem for the fuel cell membrane in contrast to DMFC and LT-PEM fuel cell.
- Hydrogen with low purity can be used as fuel. Hydrogen with low purity is cheaper than high purity hydrogen which has to be usually used for LT-PEM fuel cell.
- The use of fuels like methanol makes cheaper fuel costs per kWh possible compared with hydrogen (e.g. LT-PEM fuel cells) or diesel (e.g. gensets) as fuel.

=== Weaknesses ===
- Longer start-up time compared to LT-PEM fuel cell (time for heating of stack and reformer). So hybridization with larger battery than for LT-PEM fuel cell systems is sometimes necessary.
- A system component for stack heating during start-up is necessary in contrast to LT-PEM fuel cell and DMFC.
- More cells needed compared to LT-PEM fuel cell for reaching high power output or same efficiency as for hydrogen LT-PEM fuel cell because of inferior characteristic curve of HT-PEM fuel cell: Higher stack costs, stack volume and stack weight compared to LT-PEM fuel cell. Technologies for reaching better characteristic curve properties are in basic research state.
- Higher platinum content (ca. 8 - 14 g Pt per kW) than in LT-PEM fuel cells is used in the Membrane Electrode Assembly: Platinum recycling to be considered. Development of platinum free electrodes for HT-PEM fuel cells is in basic research state.
- When organic fuels are used carbon dioxide and perhaps traces of carbon monoxide are emitted (concentration depending on system design, typically CO concentration by far lower than emitted from combustion engines).
- Some system components must be able to resist higher temperatures than in LT-PEM fuel cell and DMFC which limits the choice of applicable materials (e.g. polymers with resistance up to 120 - 180 °C).

== Applications ==
HT-PEM fuel cell systems are used for stationary and portable applications. For example, methanol fueled HT-PEM fuel cells are used as replacement of generators (e.g. off-grid applications, backup power, emergency-power supply, auxiliary power unit) and for range extension of electric vehicles (e.g. sports car Gumpert Nathalie). Typically the HT-PEM fuel cell system is used in hybrid operation with a battery. HT-PEM fuel cell systems fueled with natural gas are also used for combined heat and power (CHP) applications in buildings. Hydrogen-fueled HT-PEM technology is also in development for commercial aircraft,

Manufacturers of fuel cell systems containing HT-PEM fuel cell technology:

- Advent Technologies (USA)
- Blue World Technologies (Denmark)
- Siqens (Germany)
- ZeroAvia (UK/USA)

== See also ==
- Reformed Methanol Fuel Cell (RMFC)
- Steam reforming
- Methanol reformer
