= Reformed methanol fuel cell =

Fuel Cell Type

block diagram of a Reformed Methanol Fuel Cell

Reformed methanol fuel cell (RMFC) or indirect methanol fuel cell (IMFC) systems are a subcategory of proton-exchange fuel cells where, the fuel, methanol (CH_{3}OH), is reformed, before being fed into the fuel cell.

RMFC systems offer advantages over direct methanol fuel cell (DMFC) systems including higher efficiency, smaller cell stacks, less requirement on methanol purity, no water management, better operation at low temperatures, and storage at sub-zero temperatures because methanol is a liquid from −97.0 to 64.7 °C (−142.6 to 148.5 °F) and as there is no liquid methanol-water mixture in the cells which can destroy the membrane of DMFC in case of frost.

The reason for the high efficiency of RMFC in contrast to DMFC is that hydrogen containing gas is fed to the fuel cell stack instead of methanol and overpotential (power loss for catalytic conversion) on anode is much lower for hydrogen than for methanol. The tradeoff is that RMFC systems operate at hotter temperatures and therefore need more advanced heat management and insulation. The waste products with these types of fuel cells are carbon dioxide and water.

Methanol is used as a fuel because it is naturally hydrogen dense (a hydrogen carrier) and can be steam reformed into hydrogen at low temperatures compared to other hydrocarbon fuels. Additionally, methanol is naturally occurring, biodegradable, and energy dense.

RMFC systems consist of a fuel processing system (FPS), a fuel cell, a fuel cartridge, and the BOP (the balance of plant).

== Storage and Fuel Costs ==
The fuel cartridge stores the methanol fuel. Depending on the system design either 100% methanol (IMPCA industrial standard) or a mixture of methanol with up to 40 vol% water is usually used as fuel for the RMFC system. 100% methanol results in lower fuel consumption than water-methanol mixture (Premix) but goes along with higher fuel cell system complexity for condensing of cathode moisture.

Fuel Costs for RMFC typically are about 0.4-1.1 USD/kWh (conventional methanol) resp. 0.45-1.3 USD/kWh (renewable methanol produced from municipal waste or renewable electricity). By comparison, for a hydrogen fueled Low Temperature-PEM fuel cell costs for conventional hydrogen (in bundle of bottles) are about 4.5-10 USD/kWh.

== Fuel processing system (FPS) in ==
Methanol→Partial oxidation(POX)/Autothermal reforming (ATR)→Water gas shift reaction (WGS)→preferential oxidation (PROX) The methanol reformer converts methanol to H_{2} and CO_{2}, a reaction that occurs at temperatures of 250 °C to 300 °C.

== Fuel cell ==
→The membrane electrode assembly (MEA) fuel cell stack produces electricity in a reaction that combines H_{2} (reformed from methanol in the fuel processor) and O_{2} and produces water (H_{2}O) as a byproduct. Usually Low Temperature Proton-exchange membrane fuel cell (LT-PEMFC) or High Temperature Proton-exchange membrane fuel cell (HT-PEMFC) is used for RMFC.

== Fuel processing system (FPS) out ==
Tail gas combustor (TGC) catalytic combustion afterburner or (catalytic combustion) with a platinum-alumina (Pt–Al_{2}O_{3}) catalyst→condenser

== Balance of plant ==
The balance of plant (BOP) consists of any fuel pumps, air compressors, and fans required to circulate the gas and liquid in the system. A control system is also often needed to operate and monitor the RMFC.

== State of development and commercial products ==
RMFC systems have reached an advanced stage of development. For instance, a small system developed by Ultracell for the United States military, , has met environmental tolerance, safety, and performance goals set by the United States Army Communications-Electronics Research, Development and Engineering Center, and is commercially available.

Larger systems 350W to 8 MW are also available for multiple applications, such as power plant generation, backup power generation, emergency power supply, auxiliary power unit (APU) and battery range extension (electric vehicles, ships).

In contrast to diesel or gasoline generators maintenance interval of RMFC systems is usually significantly longer as no exchange of oil-filters and other engine service parts is needed. So the use of RMFC in off-grid applications (e.g. highway maintenance) and remote areas (e.g. telecom, mountains) is often preferred over diesel gensets.

Also other features as biodegradability of methanol, the possibility to use renewable methanol, low fuel costs, no emission of particlulate matter/NOx, low noise and a low fuel consumption (long fuel supply interval) are seen advantageous.

The electric vehicle sports car Gumpert Nathalie contains RMFC technology.

Danish company called Blue World Technologies is building the biggest plant in the world to produce indirect methanol fuel cell stacks for automotive applications.

Companies that indicate the use of RMFC:
Company	Country	Fuel Cell type (stack)	Fuel
Blue World Technologies ApS	Denmark	HT-PEM	
CHEM	Taiwan	PEM	methanol-water mixture
Siqens GmbH	Germany	HT-PEM	100% methanol or methanol-water mixture
UltraCell LLC	USA		methanol-water mixture
Advent Technologies	USA	HT-PEM	

== See also ==
- Methanol reformer
- Methanol (data page)
- Methanol economy
- Micropump
- Fuel cell
- Glossary of fuel cell terms
- Hydrogen technologies
- Portable fuel cell applications
