= Methanol economy =

Using methanol in the energy transition

The methanol economy is a suggested future economy in which methanol and dimethyl ether replace fossil fuels as a means of energy storage, ground transportation fuel, and raw material for synthetic hydrocarbons and their products. It offers an alternative to the proposed hydrogen economy or ethanol economy, although these concepts are not exclusive. Methanol can be produced from a variety of sources including fossil fuels (natural gas, coal, oil shale, tar sands, etc.) as well as agricultural products and municipal waste, wood and varied biomass. It can also be made from chemical recycling of carbon dioxide.

Nobel Prize laureate George A. Olah advocated a methanol economy.

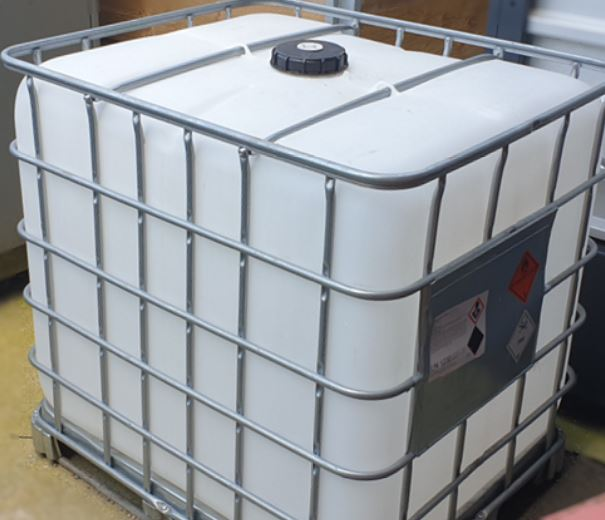
IBC container with 1000 L renewable methanol (the energy content is the same as that of 160 pieces of 50 L gas cylinders (a net volume of 8000 L) filled with hydrogen at 200 bar)

== Uses ==
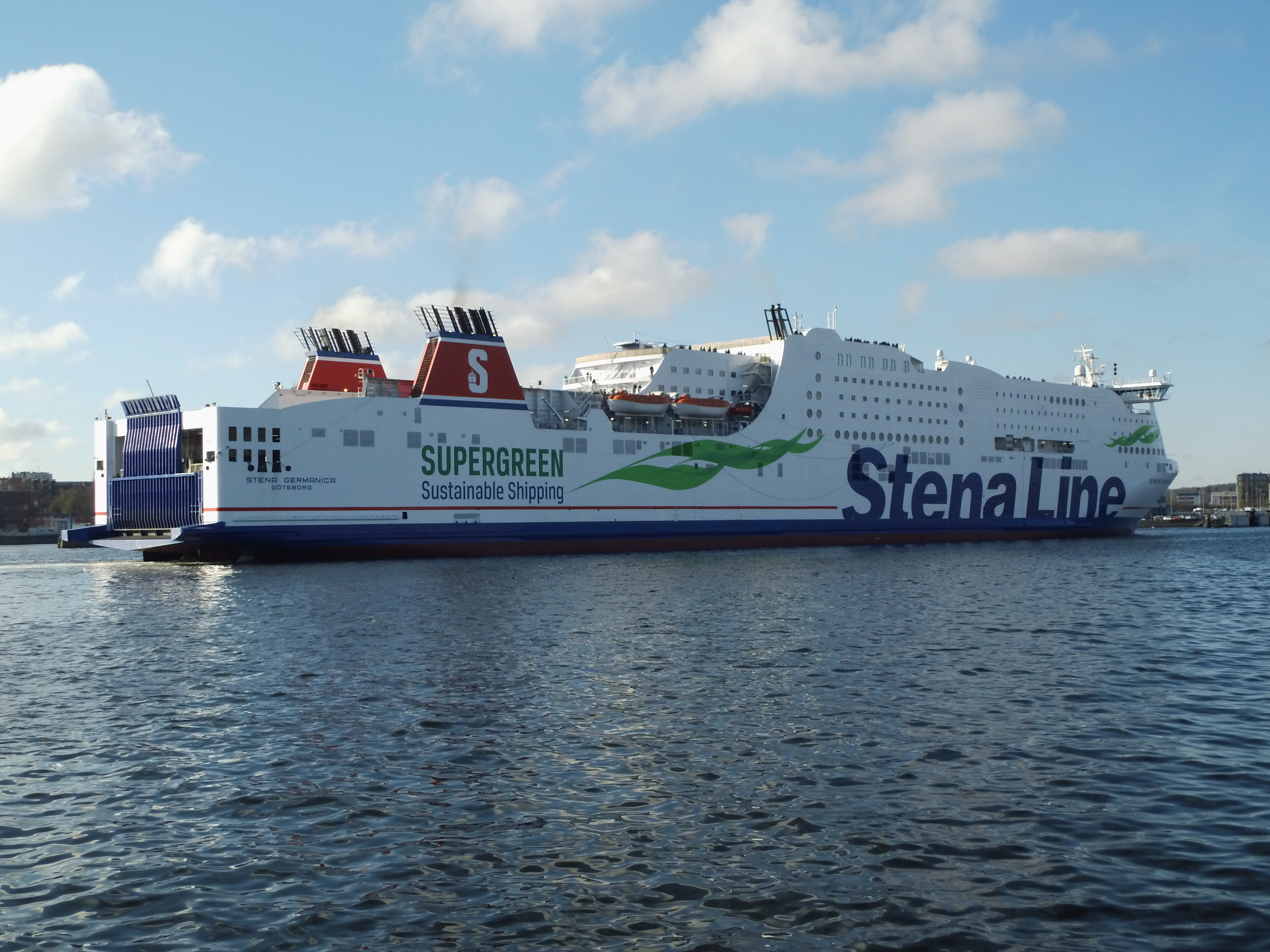
Ferry with methanol engine (Stena Germanica Kiel)

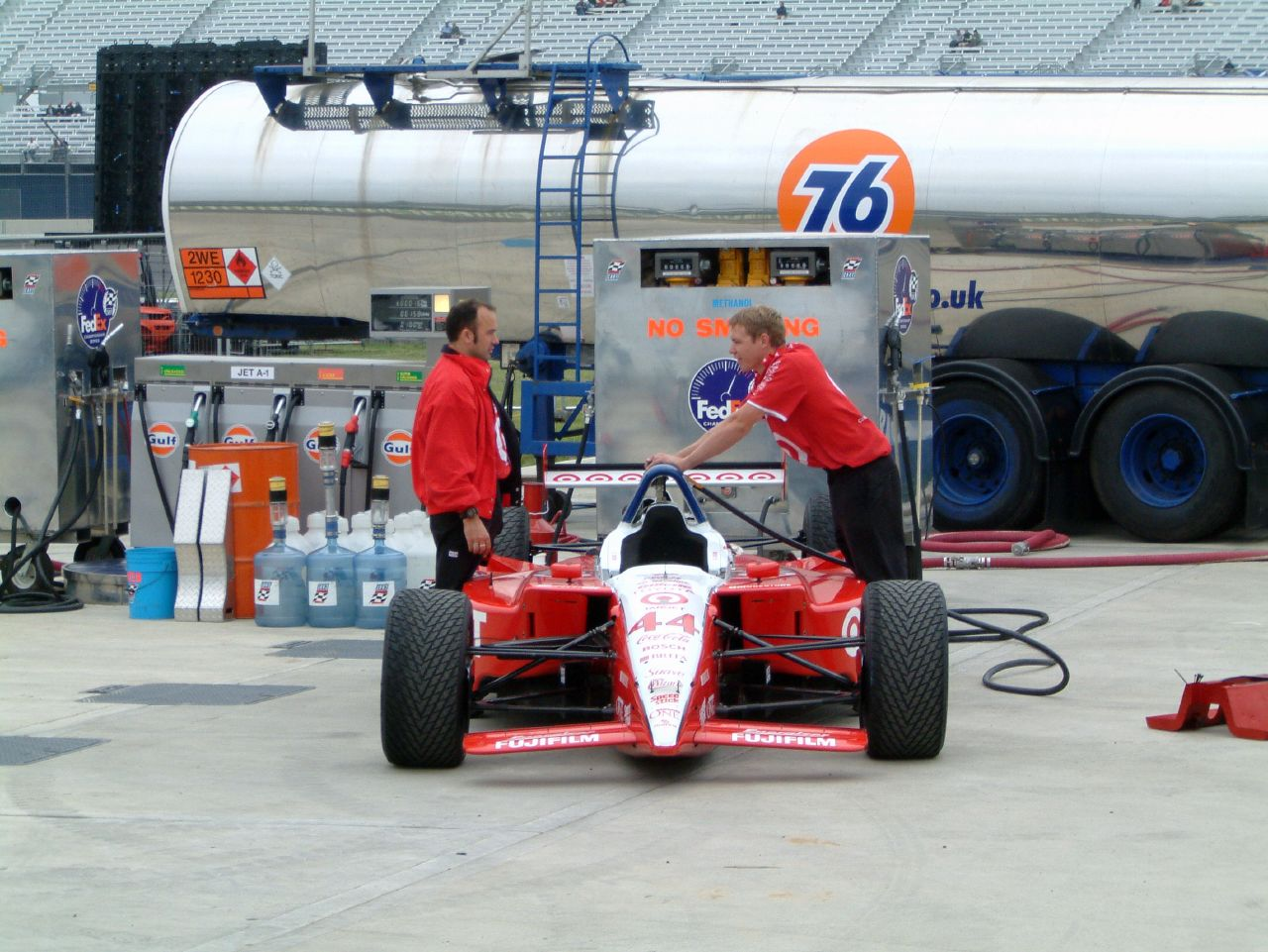
Racing car with methanol combustion engine

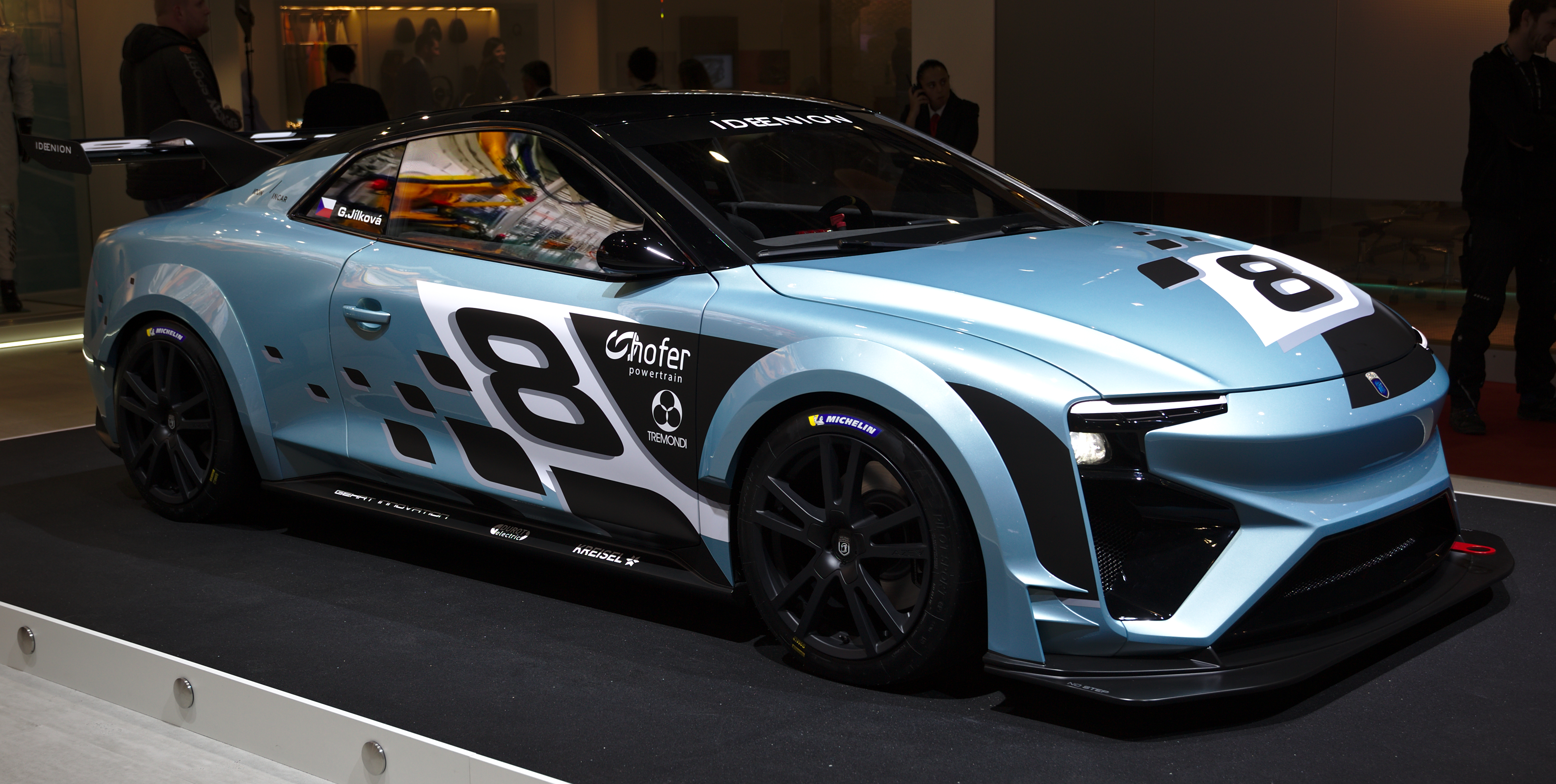
Sports car with reformed methanol fuel cell (Nathalie)

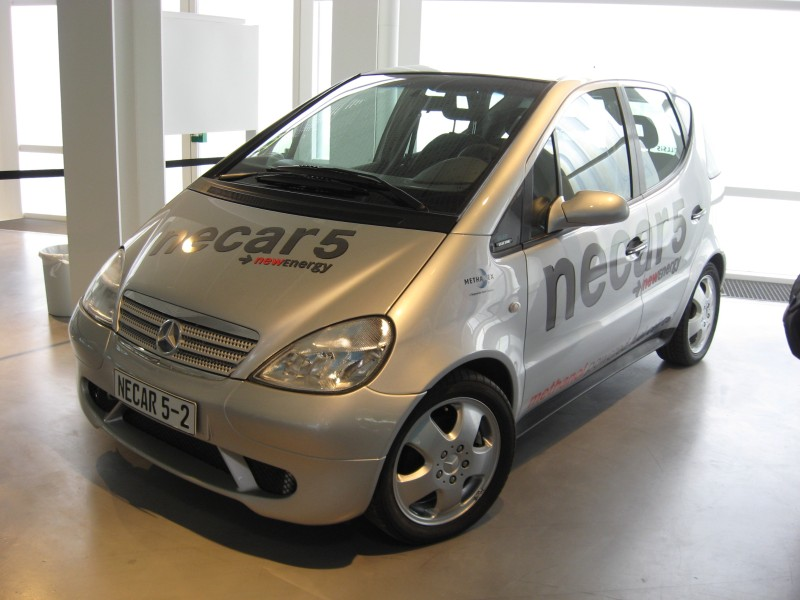
Passenger car with reformed methanol fuel cell (Necar 5)

=== Fuel ===
Methanol is a fuel for heat engines and fuel cells. Due to its high octane rating it can be used directly as a fuel in flex-fuel cars (including hybrid and plug-in hybrid vehicles) using existing internal combustion engines (ICE). Methanol can also be burned in some other kinds of engine or to provide heat as other liquid fuels are used. Fuel cells can use methanol either directly in Direct Methanol Fuel Cells (DMFC) or indirectly (after conversion into hydrogen by reforming) in a Reformed Methanol Fuel Cell (RMFC).

==== Green methanol ====
Green methanol is a liquid fuel that is produced from combining carbon dioxide and hydrogen (CO_{2} + 3 H_{2} → CH_{3}OH + H_{2}O) under pressure and heat with catalysts. It is a way to reuse carbon capture for recycling. Methanol can store hydrogen economically at standard outdoor temperatures and pressures, compared to liquid hydrogen and ammonia that need to use a lot of energy to stay cold in their liquid state. In 2023 the Laura Maersk was the first container ship to run on methanol fuel. Ethanol plants in the midwest are a good place for pure carbon capture to combine with hydrogen to make green methanol, with abundant wind and nuclear energy in Iowa, Minnesota, and Illinois. Mixing methanol with ethanol could make methanol a safer fuel to use because methanol doesn't have a visible flame in the daylight and doesn't emit smoke, and ethanol has a visible light yellow flame. Green hydrogen production of 70% efficiency and a 70% efficiency of methanol production from that would be a 49% energy conversion efficiency.

=== Feedstock ===
Methanol is already used today on a large scale to produce a variety of chemicals and products. Global methanol demand as a chemical feedstock reached around 42 million metric tonnes per year as of 2015. Through the methanol-to-gasoline (MTG) process, it can be transformed into gasoline. Using the methanol-to-olefin (MTO) process, methanol can also be converted to ethylene and propylene, the two chemicals produced in largest amounts by the petrochemical industry. These are important building blocks for the production of essential polymers (LDPE, HDPE, PP) and like other chemical intermediates are currently produced mainly from petroleum feedstock. Their production from methanol could therefore reduce our dependency on petroleum. It would also make it possible to continue producing these chemicals when fossil fuels reserves are depleted.

== Production ==
Today most methanol is produced from methane through syngas. Trinidad and Tobago is the world's largest methanol producer, with exports mainly to the United States. The feedstock for the production of methanol comes from natural gas.

The conventional route to methanol from methane passes through syngas generation by steam reforming combined (or not) with partial oxidation. Alternative ways to convert methane into methanol have also been investigated. These include:

- Methane oxidation with homogeneous catalysts in sulfuric acid media
- Methane bromination followed by hydrolysis of the obtained bromomethane
- Direct partial oxidation of methane with oxygen, including trapping of the partially oxidized product and subsequent extraction on copper and iron exchanged Zeolite (e.g. Alpha-Oxygen)
- Microbial conversion of methane
- Photochemical conversion of methane

All these synthetic routes emit the greenhouse gas carbon dioxide CO_{2}. To mitigate this, methanol can be made through ways minimizing the emission of CO_{2}. One solution is to produce it from syngas obtained by biomass gasification. For this purpose any biomass can be used including wood, wood wastes, grass, agricultural crops and their by-products, animal waste, aquatic plants and municipal waste. There is no need to use food crops as in the case of ethanol from corn, sugar cane and wheat.

Biomass → Syngas (CO, CO_{2}, H_{2}) → CH_{3}OH

Methanol can be synthesized from carbon and hydrogen from any source, including fossil fuels and biomass. CO_{2} emitted from fossil fuel burning power plants and other industries and eventually even the CO_{2} contained in the air, can be a source of carbon. It can also be made from chemical recycling of carbon dioxide, which Carbon Recycling International has demonstrated with its first commercial scale plant. Initially the major source will be the CO_{2} rich flue gases of fossil-fuel-burning power plants or exhaust from cement and other factories. In the longer range however, considering diminishing fossil fuel resources and the effect of their utilization on Earth's atmosphere, even the low concentration of atmospheric CO_{2} itself could be captured and recycled via methanol, thus supplementing nature's own photosynthetic cycle. Efficient new absorbents to capture atmospheric CO_{2} are being developed, mimicking plants' ability. Chemical recycling of CO_{2} to new fuels and materials could thus become feasible, making them renewable on the human timescale.

Methanol can also be produced at atmospheric pressure from CO_{2} by catalytic hydrogenation of CO_{2} with H_{2} where the hydrogen has been obtained from water electrolysis. This is the process used by Carbon Recycling International of Iceland. Methanol may also be produced through CO_{2} electrochemical reduction, if electrical power is available. The energy needed for these reactions in order to be carbon neutral would come from renewable energy sources such as wind, hydroelectricity and solar as well as nuclear power. In effect, all of them allow free energy to be stored in easily transportable methanol, which is made immediately from hydrogen and carbon dioxide, rather than attempting to store energy in free hydrogen.

CO_{2} + 3 H_{2} → CH_{3}OH + H_{2}O

Or with electric energy:

CO_{2} + 5 H_{2}O + 6 e^{−} → CH_{3}OH + 6 HO^{−}

6 HO^{−} → 3 H_{2}O + 1.5 O_{2} + 6 e^{−}

Total:

CO_{2} + 2 H_{2}O + electrical energy → CH_{3}OH + 1.5 O_{2}

The necessary CO_{2} would be captured from fossil fuel burning power plants and other industrial flue gases including cement factories. With diminishing fossil fuel resources and therefore CO_{2} emissions, the CO_{2} content in the air could also be used. Considering the low concentration of CO_{2} in air (0.04%) improved and economically viable technologies to absorb CO_{2} will have to be developed. For this reason, extraction of CO_{2} from water could be more feasible due to its higher concentrations in dissolved form. This would allow the chemical recycling of CO_{2}, thus mimicking nature's photosynthesis.

In large-scale renewable methanol is mainly produced of fermented biomass as well as municipal solid waste (bio-methanol) and of renewable electricity (e-methanol). Production costs for renewable methanol currently are about 300 to US$1000/t for bio-methanol, about 800 to US$1600/t for e-methanol of carbon dioxide of renewable sources and about 1100 to US$2400/t for e-methanol of carbon dioxide of direct air capture.

== Efficiency for production and use of e-methanol ==
Methanol which is produced of CO_{2} and water by the use of electricity is called e-methanol. Typically hydrogen is produced by electrolysis of water which is then transformed with CO_{2} to methanol. Currently the efficiency for hydrogen production by water electrolysis of electricity amounts to 75 to 85% with potential up to 93% until 2030. Efficiency for methanol synthesis of hydrogen and carbon dioxide currently is 79 to 80%. Thus the efficiency for production of methanol from electricity and carbon dioxide is about 59 to 78%. If CO_{2} is not directly available but is obtained by direct air capture then the efficiency amounts to 50-60 % for methanol production by use of electricity. When methanol is used in a methanol fuel cell the electrical efficiency of the fuel cell is about 35 to 50% (status of 2021). Thus the electrical overall efficiency for the production of e-methanol with electricity including the following energy conversion of e-methanol to electricity amounts to about 21 to 34% for e-methanol of directly available CO_{2} and to about 18 to 30% for e-methanol produced by CO_{2} which is obtained by direct air capture.

If waste heat is used for a high temperature electrolysis or if waste heat of electrolysis, methanol synthesis and/or of the fuel cell is used then the overall efficiency can be significantly increased beyond electrical efficiency. For example, an overall efficiency of 86% can be reached by using waste heat (e.g. for district heating) which is obtained by production of e-methanol by electrolysis or by the following methanol synthesis. If the waste heat of a fuel cell is used a fuel cell efficiency of 85 to 90% can be reached. The waste heat can for example be used for heating of a vehicle or a household. Also the generation of coldness by using waste heat is possible with a refrigeration machine. With an extensive use of waste heat an overall efficiency of 70 to 80% can be reached for production of e-methanol including the following use of the e-methanol in a fuel cell.

The electrical system efficiency including all losses of peripheral devices (e.g. cathode compressor, stack cooling) amounts to about 40 to 50% for a methanol fuel cell of RMFC type and to 40 to 55% for a hydrogen fuel cell of LT-PEMFC type.

Araya et al. compared the hydrogen path with the methanol path (for methanol of directly available CO_{2}). Here the electrical efficiency from electricity supply to delivery of electricity by a fuel cell was determined with following intermediate steps: power management, conditioning, transmission, hydrogen production by electrolysis, methanol synthesis resp. hydrogen compression, fuel transportation, fuel cell. For the methanol path the efficiency was investigated as 23 to 38% and for the hydrogen path as 24 to 41%. With the hydrogen path a large part of energy is lost by hydrogen compression and hydrogen transport, whereas for the methanol path energy for methanol synthesis is needed.

Helmers et al. compared the well-to-wheel (WTW) efficiency of vehicles. The WTW efficiency was determined as 10 to 20% for with fossile gasoline operated vehicles with internal combustion engine, as 15 to 29% for with fossile gasoline operated full electric hybrid vehicles with internal combustion engine, as 13 to 25% for with fossile Diesel operated vehicles with internal combustion engine, as 12 to 21% for with fossile CNG operated vehicles with internal combustion engine, as 20 to 29% for fuel cell vehicles (e.g. fossile hydrogen or methanol) and as 59 to 80% for battery electric vehicles.

In German study "Agora Energiewende" different drive technologies by using renewable electricity for fuel production were examined and a WTW efficiency of 13% for vehicles with internal combustion engine (operated with synthetic fuel like OME), 26% for fuel cell vehicles (operated with hydrogen) and 69% for battery electric vehicles was determined.

If renewable hydrogen is used the well-to-wheel efficiency for a hydrogen fuel cell car amounts to about 14 to 30%.

If renewable e-methanol is produced from directly available CO_{2} the well-to-wheel efficiency amounts to about 11 to 21% for a vehicle with internal combustion engine which is operated with this e-methanol and to about 18 to 29% for a fuel cell vehicle which is operated with this e-methanol. If renewable e-methanol is produced from CO_{2} of direct air capture the well-to-wheel efficiency amounts to about 9 to 19% for a vehicle with internal combustion engine which is operated with this e-methanol and to about 15 to 26% for a fuel cell vehicle which is operated with this e-methanol (status of 2021).

== Cost comparison methanol economy vs. hydrogen economy ==
=== Fuel costs ===
Methanol is cheaper than hydrogen. For large amounts (tank) price for fossil methanol is about 0.3 to US$0.5/L. One liter of Methanol has the same energy content as 0.13 kg hydrogen. Price for 0.13 kg of fossil hydrogen is currently about 1.2 to US$1.3 for large amounts (about US$9.5/kg at hydrogen refuelling stations). For middle scale amounts (delivery in IBC container with 1000 L methanol) price for fossil methanol is usually about 0.5 to US$0.7/L, for biomethanol about 0.7 to US$2.0/L and for e-methanol from CO_{2} about 0.8 to US$2.0/L plus deposit for IBC container. For middle scale amounts of hydrogen (bundle of gas cylinders) price for 0.13 kg of fossil hydrogen is usually about 5 to US$12 plus rental fee for the cylinders. The significantly higher price for hydrogen compared to methanol is amongst others caused by the complex logistics and storage of hydrogen. Whereas biomethanol and renewable e-methanol are available at distributors, green hydrogen is typically not yet available at distributors. Prices for renewable hydrogen as well as for renewable methanol are expected to decrease in future.

=== Infrastructure ===
For future it is expected that for passenger cars a high percentage of vehicles will be full electric battery vehicles. For utility vehicles and trucks percentage of full electric battery vehicles is expected to be significantly lower than for passenger cars. The rest of vehicles is expected to be based on fuel. While methanol infrastructure for 10 000 refuelling stations would cost about 0.5 to US$2.0 billion, cost for a hydrogen infrastructure for 10 000 refuelling stations would be about 16 to US$1400 billion with strong dependence on hydrogen throughput of the hydrogen refuelling station.

=== Energy conversion ===
While for vehicles with internal combustion engine that are fuelled with methanol there are no significant additional costs compared to gasoline-fuelled vehicles, additional costs for a passenger car with methanol fuel cell would be about -600 to US$2400 compared with a passenger car with hydrogen fuel cell (primarily additional costs for reformer, balance of plant components and perhaps stack minus costs for hydrogen tank and hydrogen high-pressure instruments).

== Advantages ==
In the process of photosynthesis, green plants use the energy of sunlight to split water into free oxygen (which is released) and free hydrogen. Rather than attempt to store the hydrogen, plants immediately capture carbon dioxide from the air to allow the hydrogen to reduce it to storable fuels such as hydrocarbons (plant oils and terpenes) and polyalcohols (glycerol, sugars and starches). In the methanol economy, any process which similarly produces free hydrogen, proposes to immediately use it "captively" to reduce carbon dioxide into methanol, which, like plant products from photosynthesis, has great advantages in storage and transport over free hydrogen itself.

Methanol is a liquid under normal conditions, allowing it to be stored, transported and dispensed easily, much like gasoline and diesel fuel. It can also be readily transformed by dehydration into dimethyl ether, a diesel fuel substitute with a cetane number of 55.

Methanol is water-soluble: An accidental release of methanol in the environment would cause much less damage than a comparable gasoline or crude oil spill. Unlike these fuels, methanol is biodegradable and totally soluble in water, and would be rapidly diluted to a concentration low enough for microorganism to start biodegradation. This effect is already exploited in water treatment plants, where methanol is already used for denitrification and as a nutrient for bacteria. Accidental release causing groundwater pollution has not been thoroughly studied yet, though it is believed that it might undergo relatively rapid.

=== Comparison with hydrogen ===
Methanol economy advantages compared to a hydrogen economy:

- Efficient energy storage by volume, as compared with compressed hydrogen. When hydrogen pressure-confinement vessel is taken into account, an advantage in energy storage by weight can also be realized. The volumetric energy density of methanol is considerably higher than liquid hydrogen, in part because of the low density of liquid hydrogen of 71 grams/litre. Hence there is actually more hydrogen in a litre of methanol (99 grams/litre) than in a litre of liquid hydrogen, and methanol needs no cryogenic container maintained at a temperature of -253 °C .
- A liquid hydrogen infrastructure would be prohibitively expensive. Methanol can use existing gasoline infrastructure with only limited modifications.
- Can be blended with gasoline (for example in M85, a mixture containing 85% methanol and 15% gasoline).
- User friendly. Hydrogen is volatile, and its confinements uses high pressure or cryogenic systems.
- Less losses : Hydrogen leaks more easily than methanol. Heat will evaporate liquid hydrogen, giving expected losses up to 0.3% per day in storage tanks. (see Chart Ferox storage tanks Liquid oxygen).

=== Comparison with ethanol ===
- Can be made from any organic material using proven technology going through syngas. There is no need to use food crops and compete with food production. The amount of methanol that can be generated from biomass is much greater than ethanol.
- Can compete with and complement ethanol in a diversified energy marketplace. Methanol obtained from fossil fuels has a lower price than ethanol.
- Can be blended in gasoline like ethanol. In 2007, China blended more than 1 billion US gallons (3,800,000 m^{3}) of methanol into fuel and will introduce methanol fuel standard by mid-2008. M85, a mixture of 85% methanol and 15% gasoline can be used much like E85 sold in some gas stations today.

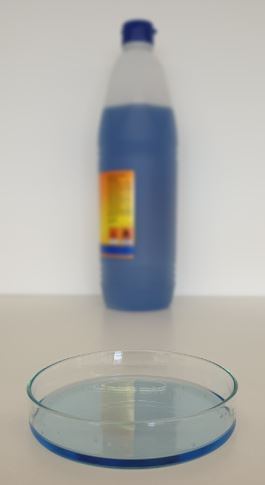
Methanol from Supermarket as grill lighter fluid (Spain, 99 % methanol, colored blue)

== Disadvantages ==
- High energy costs currently associated with generating and transporting hydrogen offsite.
- Presently generated from natural gas still dependent on fossil fuels (although any combustible hydrocarbon can be used).
- Production from biomass is highly land-intensive
- Energy density (by weight or volume) one half of that of gasoline and 24% less than ethanol
- Handling
  - If no inhibitors are used, methanol is corrosive to some common metals including aluminum, zinc and manganese. Parts of the engine fuel-intake systems are made from aluminum. Similar to ethanol, compatible material for fuel tanks, gasket and engine intake have to be used.
  - As with similarly corrosive and hydrophilic ethanol, existing pipelines designed for petroleum products cannot handle methanol. Thus methanol requires shipment at higher energy cost in trucks and trains, until new pipeline infrastructure can be built, or existing pipelines are retrofitted for methanol transport.
  - Methanol, as an alcohol, increases the permeability of some plastics to fuel vapors (e.g. high-density polyethylene). This property of methanol has the possibility of increasing emissions of volatile organic compounds (VOCs) from fuel, which contributes to increased tropospheric ozone and possibly human exposure.
- Low volatility in cold weather: pure methanol-fueled engines can be difficult to start, and they run inefficiently until warmed up. This is why a mixture containing 85% methanol and 15% gasoline called M85 is generally used in ICEs. The gasoline allows the engine to start even at lower temperatures.
- With the exception of low level exposure, methanol is toxic. (Note: Methanol is a developmental and neurological toxin, though typical dietary and occupational levels of exposure are not likely to induce significant health effects. In 2003, a National Toxicology Program panel concluded that for blood concentrations below approx. 10 mg/L there is minimal concern for adverse health effects. Other literature summaries are also available.) Methanol is lethal when ingested in larger amounts (30 to 100 mL). But so are most motor fuels, including gasoline (120 to 300 mL) and diesel fuel. Gasoline also contains small amounts of many compounds known to be carcinogenic (e.g. benzene). Methanol is not a carcinogen, nor does it contain carcinogens. However, methanol may be metabolized in the body to formaldehyde, which is both toxic and carcinogenic. Methanol occurs naturally in small quantities in the human body and in edible fruits.
- Methanol is a liquid: this creates a greater fire risk compared to hydrogen in open spaces as Methanol leaks do not dissipate. Methanol burns invisibly unlike gasoline. Compared to gasoline, however, methanol is much safer. It is more difficult to ignite and releases less heat when it burns. Methanol fires can be extinguished with plain water, whereas gasoline floats on water and continues to burn. The EPA has estimated that switching fuels from gasoline to methanol would reduce the incidence of fuel related fires by 90%.

== Status and Production of renewable methanol ==
=== Europe ===
- In Iceland the company Carbon Recycling International operates a plant for production of e-methanol of CO_{2} from a geothermal plant with a methanol manufacturing capacity of more than 4000 t/a. The plant was named after George Olah.
- BioMCN from Netherlands has a production capacity of more than 60 000 t/a for production of renewable methanol (biomethanol and e-methanol)
- BASF produces methanol of renewable resources named EU-REDcert methanol using waste based biomass.
- In May 2019 a demonstration plant was started in Germany in Niederaußem with a daily production capacity of one ton as part of the project MefCO_{2}. The methanol was used for denitrification in a waste water treatment facility.
- In Germany there is a project called Carbon2Chem of Thyssenkrupp to produce methanol from smelter gases.
- Within the scope of the consortium Power to Methanol Antwerp BV consisting of ENGIE, Fluxys, Indaver, INOVYN, Oiltanking, PMV and Port of Antwerp a plant for production of 8000 t/a renewable methanol shall be built. The CO_{2} for the production of the e-methanol shall be separated by Carbon Capture and Utilisation (CCU) from emissions.
- Wacker Chemie AG from Germany plans as part of a submitted funding project (RHYME) to build a plant for production of green hydrogen and renewable methanol (as of April 2021). For synthesis of methanol of green hydrogen the CO_{2} shall be originated from production processes of the chemical site and perhaps of other industrial processes (e.g. CO_{2} from cement plants). 15 000 t/a of renewable methanol shall be produced which shall be used for company internal production processes (e.g. synthesis of silicones) as well as for selling as a fuel.
- At sites Sundsvall and Örnsköldsvik in Northern Sweden, the consortium Liquid Wind together with Worley plan a plant with a production capacity of 50 000 t/a for renewable e-methanol (as of May 2021). The CO_{2} shall be originated from a biomass plant. Until 2050 Liquid Wind wants to build 500 similar plants. Members of the consortium are Alfa Laval, Haldor Topsoe, Carbon Clean and Siemens Energy.
- Total Energies (the largest methanol producer in Europe with production capacity of 700 000 t/a) starts the project e-CO2Met for production of renewable methanol in Leuna, Germany (as of June 2021). Hereby a 1 MW high temperature electrolyzer shall be used. The CO_{2} for the methanol production shall be originated from production processes of a refinery.

=== North America ===
- Enerkem from Canada produces renewable Methanol with a capacity of 100 000 t/a. The methanol is produced from municipal solid waste.
- Celanese announced in May 2021 the plan to produce methanol from CO_{2} at site Clear Lake, Texas. Herefore 180 000 tons of CO_{2} per year shall be used.

=== South America ===
- A consortium of Porsche, Siemens Energy, Enel, AME und ENAP plans to build production facilities for manufacturing of renewable methanol with wind power and CO_{2} from the air (as of July 2021). With assistance of ExxonMobil the methanol shall be transformed to further synthetic fuels. By 2024 the consortium wants to produce 55 million litres of eFuels and by 2026 around 550 million litres of eFuels.

=== China ===
- In the "Liquid Solar Fuel Production demonstration Project" in 2020 the large-scale production of renewable methanol with sun power with a 10 MW electrolyzer was demonstrated.
- More than 20 000 taxis are operated in China with methanol (as of 2020)
- End of 2021 in Henan province the world's largest plant for production of methanol from CO_{2} with a capacity of 110 000 t/a shall be commissioned in "Shunli CO_{2}-To-Methanol Plant" with assistance of Carbon Recycling International.
- Several major Chinese automakers such as FAW Group, Shanghai Huapu (Shanghai Maple), Geely Group, Chang'an and SAIC prepare for mass production of methanol capable vehicles and fleets of taxis and buses.
- In Shanxi province there exist more than 1000 petrol stations that sell M15 and further 40 M85-M100 refueling points. Until 2025 the government of Shanxi wants to convert more than 2000 refueling stations for methanol fuel as well as 200 000 vehicles for operation with methanol.

== See also ==
- Alcohol fuel
- Carbon neutral fuel
- Dimethyl ether
- Ethanol fuel
- Hydrogen economy
- Methanol
- Methanol fuel
- Reformed methanol fuel cell
- Synthetic fuel
- Vegetable oil economy

== Literature ==
- F. Asinger: Methanol, Chemie- und Energierohstoff. Akademie-Verlag, Berlin, 1987, ISBN 3-05500341-1, ISBN 978-3-05500341-7.
- Martin Bertau, Heribert Offermanns, Ludolf Plass, Friedrich Schmidt, Hans-Jürgen Wernicke: Methanol: The Basic Chemical and Energy Feedstock of the Future: Asinger's Vision Today, 750 Seiten, Verlag Springer; 2014, ISBN 978-3642397080
- †George A. Olah, Alain Goeppert, G. K. Surya Prakash, Beyond Oil and Gas: The Methanol Economy – Third, Updated and Enlarged Edition, Wiley-VCH, 2018, ISBN 978-3-527-33803-0.
