= Circ =

Circ or CIRC may refer to:

- Čirč, a village and municipality in northern Slovakia
- Circ (duo), an American music duo
- Cook Islands Round Cup, top division association football league in the Cook Islands

== Commercial ==
- China Insurance Regulatory Commission

== Technology ==
- \circ, MathJax for a circle character
- &circ; HTML entity for a circumflex
- Climate Impacts Research Centre
- Compact Infra Red Camera, an instrument on the satellite ALOS-2
- Cross-interleaved Reed-Solomon coding, used for error detection and error correction on compact discs
- Walkman Circ, a MP3 player

== See also ==
- Circulation (disambiguation)
- Cirque (disambiguation)
- SERC (disambiguation)
- Circa (disambiguation)
