= Carbon Recycling International =

Icelandic technology company

Carbon Recycling International Inc.
- Company type: Private
- Industry: Renewable fuels
- Founded: 2006
- Headquarters: Reykjavík, Iceland
- Key people: Lotte Rosenberg CEO; Bjork Kristjansdottir COO; Omar Sigurbjornsson (Sales and Marketing)
- Products: Renewable methanol
- Website: Carbonrecycling.com

Carbon Recycling International (CRI) is an Icelandic limited liability company which has developed a technology designed to produce renewable methanol, also known as e-methanol, from carbon dioxide and hydrogen, using water electrolysis or, alternatively, hydrogen captured from industrial waste gases. The technology is trademarked by CRI as Emissions-to-Liquids (ETL) and the renewable methanol produced by CRI is trademarked as Vulcanol. In 2011, CRI became the first company to produce and sell liquid renewable transport fuel produced using only carbon dioxide, water and electricity from renewable sources.

== History ==
CRI, incorporated in 2006, was founded by Fridrik Jonsson, Art Shulenberger, Oddur Ingolfsson, and KC Tran. In addition to Icelandic individuals and funds, investors include Canadian multinational methanol supplier and distributor Methanex and Chinese multinational automotive manufacturing company Geely.

CRI's first commercial scale plant, the George Olah Plant (named after George Andrew Olah, the 1994 Nobel Prize Laureate in chemistry), was completed in 2011. CRI is currently working on several new projects in parallel, including in an EU Horizon 2020 research programme funded MefCO2 consortium to build a renewable methanol demonstration plant in Germany and in the FreSME consortium to build a renewable methanol demonstration plant in Sweden.

== Renewable methanol ==
Renewable methanol can be used as a fuel, chemical feedstock (including various types of fuels) or blended with gasoline. Fuels which are produced partially or fully from methanol include biodiesel, dimethyl ether or oxymethylene ether, as well as synthetic gasoline from the Mobil methanol-to-gasoline (MTG) process. Gasoline blends range from 3% methanol, which is allowed in European standard gasoline, to 56% methanol, a blend for flexible fuel vehicles which has the same energy density and oxygen content as E85 gasoline. CRI has run fleet tests with a range of lower blends and higher blend options in cars from different manufacturers, including 100% methanol in special flexible fuel vehicles manufactured by Geely. Renewable methanol is compatible with internal combustion engines as well as methanol fuel cells. Internal combustion engines that operate on 100% methanol are in production both for light vehicles, trucks and ships. Methanol fuel cells of varying energy density are available from multiple manufacturers in North America, Europe and Asia.

== Production ==
CRI's first CSP, the GO Plant

Production of renewable methanol does not depend on agricultural resources, as hydrogen and carbon dioxide are the primary inputs. CRI's emissions-to-liquids production process is based on three main modules, carbon dioxide purification, hydrogen generation and the methanol synthesis and purification system. The catalytic conversion process from hydrogen and carbon dioxide occurs in one step, while production of methanol from fossil fuels, such as natural gas or coal, involves several reforming steps to obtain syngas followed by the catalytic step. Unlike some other power-to-fuel technologies, which use carbon dioxide and hydrogen as inputs, CRI's emissions-to-liquids process also does not require the carbon dioxide to be 'shifted' prior to the synthesis step.

== Plants ==
=== George Olah plant ===
The George Olah Plant, or the GO Plant, has a name-plate capacity of 5 million liters per year. It is located close to the Blue Lagoon spa facility and HS Orka's Svartsengi power station. The plant can capture and utilize around 10% of the carbon dioxide emitted by the Svartsengi power station.

=== Shunli ===
CRI commissioned the world's largest CO_{2}-to-methanol plant in October 2022. The plant is based in Anyang city, Henan Province, China and utilizes carbon dioxide recovered from existing lime production emissions and hydrogen recovered from a nearby coking facility. The plant has an annual production capacity of 110,000 tons of low-carbon intensity methanol, recycling approximately 160,000 tons of CO_{2} per year.

The methanol has been used to replace diesel fuel in heavy-duty trucks, produced by Geely Auto, and to light the flame of the Asian Games in Hangzhou in 2023. The USD 90 million project created 80 jobs and was celebrated as milestone in the development of Chinese industry towards circular value chains.

=== Sailboat ===
The Sailboat CO_{2}-to-methanol plant is located in the Shenghong Petrochemical Industrial Park in Lianyungang, Jiangsu province, China. The plant recycles approximately 150,000 tons of carbon dioxide and 20,000 tons of hydrogen from waste streams at the nearby petrochemical complex, producing 100,000 tons of low-carbon methanol annually. This methanol produced at this facility is used to manufacture polymers and plastics, including EVA coatings for solar panels and plexiglass. The plant began operation in September 2023.

== EU Horizon 2020 Research and Innovation Program ==
=== MefCO_{2} ===
Funded under the EU Horizon 2020 Framework Program, MefCO_{2} was a technology development project that ran from 2014-2019. The project demonstrated the application of CRI’s ETL technology, which produced methanol from CO_{2} emissions from a thermal power plant and electrolytic hydrogen generated from surplus renewable energy.

The CO_{2}-to-methanol production unit was integrated into the RWE Niederaussem thermal power plant and began production in early May 2019. The system successfully demonstrated the technology’s ability to operate with intermittent and fluctuating renewable energy supply as well as heterogeneous CO_{2} sources. The plant delivered 1 ton of methanol per day to a wastewater treatment facility upon the project’s completion.

=== CirclEnergy ===
The CirclEnergy project, funded by the EU Horizon 2020 program, aimed to address the challenges of integrating renewable power into the European power network, such as the oversupply of energy caused by the intermittent nature of solar and wind power.The project looked at using CRI’s ETL technology can convert surplus power from intermittent renewable energy sources into renewable methanol. The project demonstrated renewable methanol use as an effective storage and carrier of renewable energy.

=== FReSMe ===
CRI was awarded an 11 million EUR grant to implement CRI’s ETL technology in the Swerea MEFOS facility in Luleå, Sweden. The project ran from 2019-2020 and adapted the system module used in the previous MefCO_{2} project to convert residual blast furnace gases from steel manufacturing into methanol.

This project demonstrated the versatility of CRI’s ETL technology by utilizing CO_{2} and hydrogen recovered from diverse waste streams. The low-carbon methanol, produced periodically in 2020, was utilized by Stena, a Swedish ferry operator and consortium partner that operated the world's first methanol-fueled passenger ferry, the Stena Germanica.

=== Gamer ===
The GAMER project received funding of 3 million EUR with the aim of advancing high-temperature electrolysis technology. CRI was part of the consortium that worked on developing a new type of high-efficiency electrolyser with a novel solid electrolyte.

The project aimed to overcome challenges with electrolysis technologies, including instability and thermal stress. The Proton Ceramic Electrolyser was designed to be thermally coupled with waste heat sources in industrial plants, enabling the system to achieve significantly higher combined electrical and heat efficiency. The project was successfully completed in 2022.

== Legislation ==
The European Union's renewable energy directive recognizes renewable methanol as a renewable transport fuel from non-biological sources, which means that it can be used as an advanced renewable transport fuel under the EU's renewable fuel blending mandates.

== Impact ==
Carbon dioxide is a major cause of global warming. By removing carbon dioxide from industrial emissions and increasing the availability of energy derived from electricity or low-carbon intensity hydrogen, CRI's process helps to mitigate climate change. Renewable methanol burns cleanly as a fuel and substituting renewable methanol for gasoline and diesel fuels reduces urban emissions of particulate matter, sulphur oxides (SOx) and nitrous oxides (NOx).

CRI's process can also be used to store energy in the form of methanol, especially in cases where the energy source is intermittent. For example, wind and solar power are intermittently available. By storing energy from these sources in liquid chemical form, the generation of electricity and utilization of electricity does not have to be linked in time and space. Methanol is also a good energy carrier. As a liquid fuel, it is easier and cheaper to store and transport than gaseous fuels such as hydrogen or methane.

== Future projects ==
CRI plans to implement standardized CSPs (commercial scale plants), each with a capacity of at least 50,000 tons of methanol production per year.

== See also ==
- Methanol economy
