= SERC =

SERC, Serc, etc. may refer to:

== Places ==
- Sérc, a municipality in Austria

== Chemistry ==
- Phosphoserine transaminase, an enzyme

== Medicine ==
- Serc, a brand name of the antivertigo drug betahistine

== Organizations ==
- State Electricity Regulatory Commissions, in India
- South Eastern Regional College, in Northern Ireland
- State Emergency Response Commission, in the US; See Emergency Planning and Community Right-to-Know Act
- Stock Exchange Rifle Club, in England

=== Science and technology organizations ===
- Science Education Resource Center, an office of Carleton College in Minnesota, US, that provides resources for geoscience faculty
- Science and Engineering Research Council, a UK agency that oversaw publicly funded scientific research until 1994
- SERC Reliability Corporation, one of nine regional electric reliability councils of the North American Electric Reliability Corporation (NERC)
- Smithsonian Environmental Research Center, an environmental research center in Maryland, US
- Solar Energy Research Center, one of various independent solar energy research centers
- Space Environment Research Center, at Kyushu University located in Fukuoka, Japan
- Supercomputer Education Research Centre, a central computing facility at the Indian Institute of Science in Bangalore, India
- Systems Engineering Research Center, a University Affiliated Research Center (UARC) sponsored by the United States Department of Defense (DoD)

== See also ==
- Circ (disambiguation)
