= Gumpert Nathalie =

Sports car

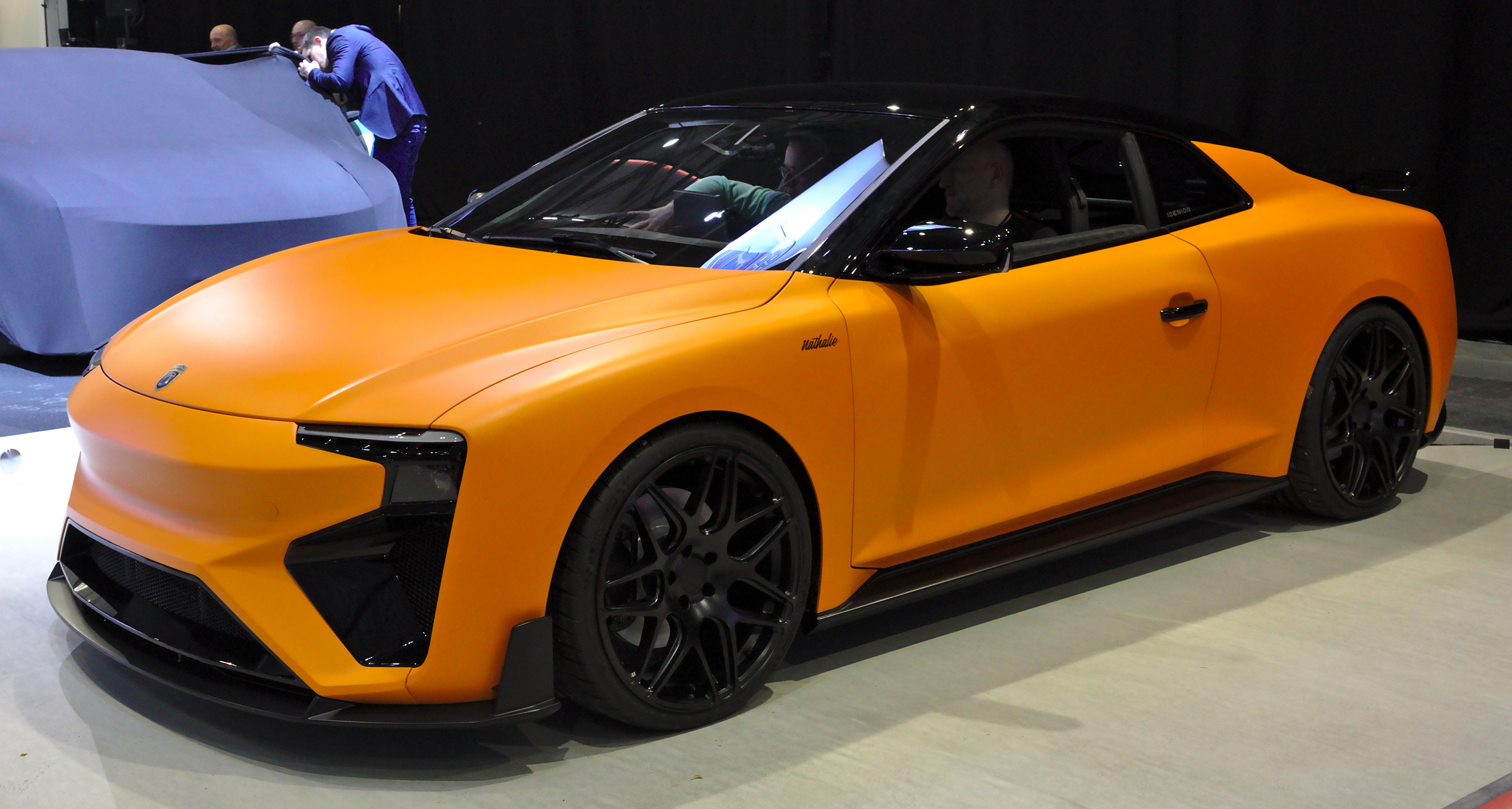

Overview
- Manufacturer: Gumpert Aiways Automobile (RG)
- Production: 2021–present
- Assembly: Germany: Ingolstadt (GUMPERT AIWAYS AUTOMOBILE GmbH); China: Shangrao (Aiways Shangrao Production Plant)
- Designer: Lorenz Loew

Body and chassis
- Class: Sports car (S)
- Body style: 2-door coupé
- Layout: Mid-engine + dual-motors, four-wheel-drive
- Doors: Scissor

Powertrain
- Engine: 15 kW (20 hp) methanol fuel cell
- Electric motor: Methanol fuel cell-powered with four electric motors of 150 kW (200 hp)
- Power output: 400 kW (540 hp)
- Transmission: Twin synchronized 2-speed gearboxes
- Hybrid drivetrain: Hydrogen-electric hybrid
- Battery: 60 kWh / 130 kWh floor-mounted li-ion battery pack

Dimensions
- Wheelbase: 2,520 mm (99.2 in)
- Length: 4,310 mm (169.7 in)
- Height: 1,310 mm (51.6 in)
- Curb weight: 1,800 kg (3,968 lb)

The Gumpert Nathalie or RG Nathalie is a hydrogen-electric hybrid sports car running on methanol to generate hydrogen that was scheduled to enter production in 2021. It is the first car produced by the new car manufacturer RG founded by Roland Gumpert, following the bankruptcy of his company Gumpert which produced the Apollo. Production is planned to be limited to 500 cars.

== History ==
=== Preamble ===
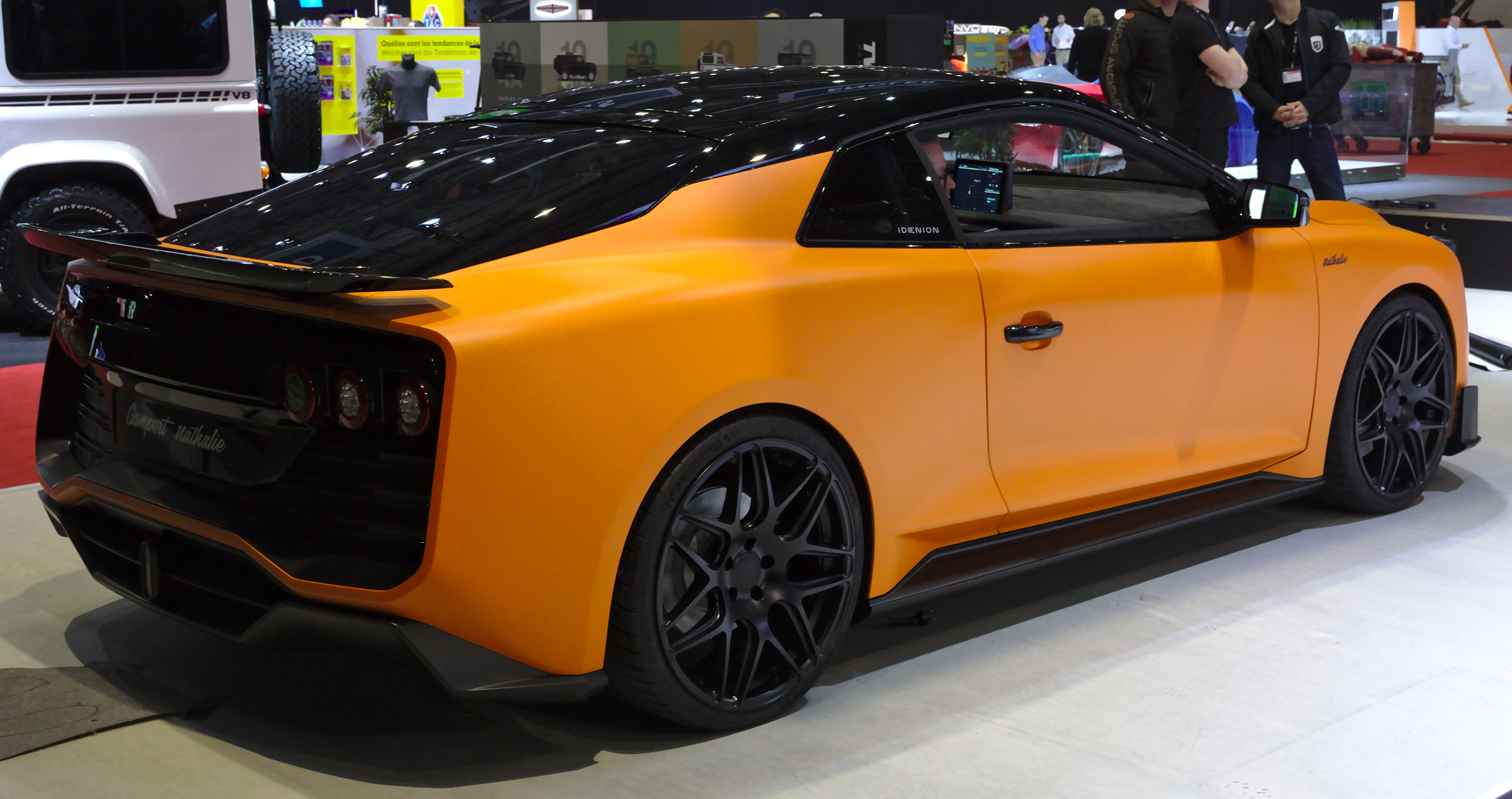
Rear view

Roland Gumpert is a former president of Audi Sport. In 2001, he had founded the automobile manufacturer Gumpert, to produce a supercar named Gumpert Apollo. In 2014, the company went bankrupt, and was taken over by Hong Kong businessman Norman Choi and consortium Consolidated Ideal TeamVenture, the owner of De Tomaso, which renames it Apollo Automobil Gmbh and produces the Apollo Intensa Emozione.

=== Presentation ===
In 2017, Roland Gumpert joined forces with Aiways, a Chinese company based in Shanghai and specialist in alternative energies, and founded his new company called “RG”, initials of Roland Gumpert, based in Ingolstadt in Germany.

At Beijing Motor Show 2018, the RG presents the prototype of its first model: the "Nathalie", named after the daughter of the founder. The RG Nathalie is to be produced at 500 copies from the end of 2019 in Germany, then in Shangrao in China and sold at a price of 420000 Euros.

At the 2019 Geneva Motor Show, Gumpert presents the RG Nathalie in its series version, produced from 2021, with its electric motor powered by a fuel cell.

=== Features ===
The Nathalie is a two-seater coupe, its line is close to the Nissan GT-R. It receives headlights with LEDs at the front, removable shutters and a light strip joining the rear lights. It is designed on a very light carbon shell which gives it high performance with a maximum speed of 300 km/h (190 mph) and a 0 to 100 km/h (62 mph) in 2.5 seconds.

The Nathalie receives four electric motors of 150 kW (200 hp), each placed in the wheels. They develop a combined power of 400 kW (540 hp) transmitted on all four wheels.

The Nathalie is equipped with a 15 kW (20 hp) fuel cell which operates on methanol and supplies a 70 kWh (250 MJ) battery. The complex system developed by RG consists of a methanol reformer which, by a catalyzed chemical reaction, divides methanol into carbon dioxide and hydrogen, the latter feeding the fuel cell which produces electricity. The fuel cell system type is indicated by the fuel cell producer as Reformed methanol fuel cell. It also increases its autonomy thanks to the recovery of energy produced during braking. It benefits from a 60-liter tank of methanol and thus a range of 600 km (370 mi) to 1,200 km (750 mi) in "eco" mode. If renewable methanol (e.g. made of municipal waste or renewable electricity) is used, a carbon-neutral operation is possible.
