= Cirque (disambiguation) =

Cirque may refer to:

- Cirque, an amphitheatre-like valley head
- Cirque (album), a 2000 album by Biosphere
- Cirque Corporation, a Salt Lake City, Utah-based company which developed and commercialized the first successful capacitive touchpad
- Cirque du Soleil, a Canadian entertainment company
- Contemporary circus (nouveau cirque), a genre of performing art developed in the later 20th century
- Le Cirque, 1891 painting by Georges Seurat

== See also ==
- Sirk'i (disambiguation)
