= SymPowerco =

Xinliwang International Holdings Company Ltd., formerly SymPowerco was an energy technology company developing the Flowing Electrolyte Direct Methanol Fuel Cell (FE DMFC). SymPowerco’s majority-owned (70%) subsidiary, Polygenic Power Systems or Polygenic Power Corp., is in charge of the development of SymPowerco's various technologies.

FE DMFC had an increased performance of approximately 30% when compared against a direct methanol fuel cell (DMFC). Other advantages of FE DMFC include a better control of temperature distributions in the whole system, and a quick shutdown of the system.

In April 2019, the company was renamed Xinliwang International Holdings Company Ltd, with John N. Davenport listed as CEO.

- Defunct website.
- Post-2019 site, also defunct.
