= Solar Energy Research Center =

Renewable energy research center in Berkeley, California

Coordinates: 37.874992°N 122.259052°W

The Solar Energy Research Center (SERC) is a research center dedicated to identifying methods for converting solar energy to renewable fuel sources. SERC opened on 25 May 2015 at the Lawrence Berkeley National Laboratory (LBL) in Berkeley, California. SERC is housed at the newly opened Chu Hall, named for Steven Chu.
