= Circulation =

Circulation may refer to:

== Science and technology ==
- Atmospheric circulation, the large-scale movement of air
- Circulation (physics), the path integral of the fluid velocity around a closed curve in a fluid flow field
- Circulatory system, a biological organ system whose primary function is to move substances to and from cells
- Circulation problem, a generalization of network flow problems
- Exhaust gas recirculation, a nitrogen oxide reduction technique used in most gasoline and diesel engines
- Ocean circulation, the large-scale movement of water

== Media ==
- Circulation (film), a 2008 psychological thriller-fantasy film by Ryan Harper
- Circulation (journal), a journal published by the American Heart Association
- Print circulation, the average number of copies of a periodical publication
- Library circulation, the activities around the lending of library books and other material to users of a lending library

== Other uses ==
- Circulation (architecture), the flow of people through a building
- Circulation (currency), all currency held by consumers and businesses, but not by financial institutions and governments
- Rhetorical circulation, the ways that texts and discourses move through time and space
