= Methanol reformer =

A methanol reformer is a device used in chemical engineering, especially in the area of fuel cell technology, which can produce pure hydrogen gas and carbon dioxide by reacting a methanol and water (steam) mixture.

$$\mathrm{ CH_3OH_{(g)} + H_2O_{(g)} \;\longrightarrow\; CO_2 + 3\ H_2 \qquad}  \Delta H_{R\ 298}^0 = 49.2\ \mathrm{kJ/mol}$$

Methanol is transformed into hydrogen and carbon dioxide by pressure and heat and interaction with a catalyst.

== Technology ==
A mixture of water and methanol with a molar concentration ratio (water:methanol) of 1.0 - 1.5 is pressurized to approximately 20 bar, vaporized and heated to a temperature of 250 - 360 °C. The hydrogen that is created is separated through the use of Pressure swing adsorption or a hydrogen-permeable membrane made of polymer or a palladium alloy.

There are two basic methods of conducting this process.

- The water-methanol mixture is introduced into a tube-shaped reactor where it makes contact with the catalyst. Hydrogen is then separated from the other reactants and products in a later chamber, either by pressure swing adsorption (PSA), or through use of a membrane where the majority of the hydrogen passes through. This method is typically used for larger, non-mobile units.
- The other process features an integrated reaction chamber and separation membrane, a membrane reactor. In this relatively new approach, the reaction chamber is made to contain high-temperature, hydrogen-permeable membranes that can be formed of refractory metals, palladium alloys, or a PdAg-coated ceramic. The hydrogen is thereby separated out of the reaction chamber as the reaction proceeds, This purifies the hydrogen and, as the reaction continues, increases both the reaction rate and the amount of hydrogen extracted.

With either design, not all of the hydrogen is removed from the product gases (raffinate). Since the remaining gas mixture still contains a significant amount of chemical energy, it is often mixed with air and burned to provide heat for the endothermic reforming reaction.

== Advantages and disadvantages ==
Methanol reformers are used as a component of stationary fuel cell systems or hydrogen fuel cell-powered vehicles (see Reformed methanol fuel cell). A prototype car, the NECAR 5, was introduced by Daimler-Chrysler in the year 2000. The primary advantage of a vehicle with a reformer is that it does not need a pressurized gas tank to store hydrogen fuel; instead methanol is stored as a liquid. The logistic implications of this are great; pressurized hydrogen is difficult to store and produce. Also, this could help ease the public's concern over the danger of hydrogen and thereby make fuel cell-powered vehicles more attractive. However, methanol, like gasoline, is toxic and (of course) flammable. The cost of the PdAg membrane and its susceptibility to damage by temperature changes provide obstacles to adoption.

While hydrogen power produces energy without CO_{2}, a methanol reformer creates the gas as a byproduct.

Methanol (prepared from natural gas) that is used in an efficient fuel cell, however, releases less CO_{2} in the atmosphere than gasoline, in a net analysis.

== See also ==
- Steam reforming
- Partial oxidation
- PROX
- Reformed methanol fuel cell
- Methanol economy
- Organic solution assisted water electrolysis
