= Hydrogen carrier =

Concept in metabolism

A hydrogen carrier is an organic macromolecule that transports atoms of hydrogen from one place to another inside a cell or from cell to cell for use in various metabolical processes. Examples include NADPH, NADH, and FADH. The main role of these is to transport hydrogen atom to electron transport chain which will change ADP to ATP by adding one phosphate during metabolic processes (e.g. photosynthesis and respiration). Hydrogen carrier participates in an oxidation-reduction reaction by getting reduced due to the acceptance of a Hydrogen. The enzyme used in Glycolysis, Dehydrogenase is used to attach the hydrogen to one of the hydrogen carrier.

== See also ==
- Electron carrier
- Light reactions
- Photosynthesis
- Cellular respiration
