= Sirk'i =

Sirk'i (Aymara for wart, also spelled Cerke, Cirque, Serke, Serkhe, Sirqui) may refer to:

- Sirk'i (Cochabamba), a mountain in the Cochabamba Department, Bolivia
- Sirk'i (La Paz), a mountain in the La Paz Department, Bolivia
- Sirk'i (Oruro), a mountain in the Oruro Department, Bolivia
- Sirk'i (Potosí), a mountain in the Potosí Department, Bolivia
