= PROX =

PROX is an acronym for PReferential OXidation, that refers to the preferential oxidation of carbon monoxide in a gas mixture by a catalyst. It is intended to remove trace amounts of CO from H_{2}/CO/CO_{2} mixtures produced by steam reforming and water-gas shift. An ideal PROX catalyst preferentially oxidizes carbon monoxide (CO) using a heterogeneous catalyst placed upon a ceramic support. Catalysts include metals such as platinum, platinum/iron, platinum/ruthenium, gold nanoparticles as well as novel copper oxide/ceramic conglomerate catalysts.

== Motivation ==
This reaction is a considerable subject area of research with implications for fuel cell design. Its main utility lies in the removal of carbon monoxide (CO) from the fuel cell's feed gas. CO poisons the catalyst of most low-temperature fuel cells.

Carbon monoxide is often produced as a by-product from steam reforming of hydrocarbons, which produces hydrogen and CO. It is possible to consume most of the CO by reacting it with steam in the water-gas shift reaction:

CO + H_{2}O ⇌ H_{2} + CO_{2}

The water-gas shift reaction can reduce CO to 1% of the feed, with the added benefit of producing more hydrogen, but not eliminate it completely. To be used in a fuel cell, feed gas must have CO below 10 ppm.

== Description ==
The PROX process allows for the reaction of CO with oxygen, reducing CO concentration from approximately 0.5–1.5% in the feed gas to less than 10 ppm.

2CO + O_{2} → 2CO_{2}

Due to the prevalent presence of hydrogen in the feed gas, the competing, undesired combustion of hydrogen will also occur to some degree:

2H_{2} + O_{2} → 2H_{2}O

The selectivity of the process is a measure of the quality of the reactor, and is defined as the ratio of consumed carbon monoxide to the total of consumed hydrogen and carbon monoxide.

The disadvantage of this technology is its very strong exothermic nature, coupled with a very narrow optimal operation temperature window, and is best operated between 353 and 450 K, yielding a hydrogen loss of around one percent. Effective cooling is therefore required. In order to minimize steam generation, excessive dilution with nitrogen is used. Additionally the reaction is interrupted with an intermediary cooler before proceeding to a second stage.

In the first reaction an excess of oxygen is provided, at around a factor of two, and about 90% of the CO is transformed. In the second step a substantially higher oxygen excess is used, at approximately a factor of 4, which is then processed with the remaining CO, in order to reduce the CO concentration to less than 10 ppm. To also avoid excess CO-fraction loading, the transient operation of a CO adsorber may be important.

The instrumentation and process control complexity requirements are relatively high. The advantage of this technique over selective methanation is the higher space velocity, which reduces the required reactor size. For the case of strong temperature rises, the feed of air can simply be broken.

The technical origins for CO-PROX lies in the synthesis of ammonia (Haber process). Ammonia synthesis also has a strict requirement of CO-free hydrogen, as CO is a strong catalyst poison for the usual catalysts used in this process.

== See also ==
- Methanol reformer
- Steam reforming
- Partial oxidation

== Bibliography ==
- Peters et al.: Gasaufbereitung für Brennstoffzellen Chemie Ingenieur Technik 76/10 (2004) 1555-1558
