= Circulation (film) =

- Directed by: Ryan Harper
- Written by: Ryan Harper
- Produced by: Jason Mitchell
- Starring: Yvonne DeLaRosa; Sherman Koltz
- Cinematography: Paul Nordin
- Edited by: Jason Mitchell
- Music by: Michael Mouracade
- Production company: Salty Dog Studios
- Distributed by: Cinema Epoch
- Release date: June 7, 2008
- Running time: 88 minutes
- Country: United States
- Languages: English; Spanish

Circulation is a 2008 fantasy-psychological thriller film written and directed by Ryan Harper. It stars Yvonne DeLaRosa and Sherman Koltz as residents in a purgatory-like existence where people are reincarnated as animals.

== Plot ==
Opening narration from Gene, a middle-aged American, explains that he has died, entered purgatory, and has been having strange dreams and compulsions. In this afterlife, people slowly take on the characteristics of animals, and Gene's nature is that of a spider. As he drifts aimlessly through Baja, Mexico, where he died while on vacation, he meets a Mexican woman named Ana who can speak no English. Ana, who is taking on the characteristics of a caterpillar, died on the way to meet her boyfriend when her abusive ex-husband attempted to kidnap her. Because he speaks no Spanish, Gene can only understand that she needs help. Grateful to find a purpose, Gene decides to help Ana, unaware of the danger posed by her violent ex-husband, who also died in the botched kidnapping attempt. Along the way, Gene and Ana witness much in the way of strange behavior, and they begin to give in to their own bestial compulsions: Ana begins eating leaves, while Gene becomes obsessed with wrapping everything in web-like rope. Although ashamed at the cannibalistic ramifications, Gene ultimately begins eating corpses he has wrapped in rope. In the end, Gene preys upon and consumes Ana's ex-husband.

== Cast ==
- Yvonne DeLaRosa as Ana
- Sherman Koltz as Gene

== Production ==
Director Ryan Harper was inspired to set the film in Baja after taking a road trip there himself. Harper, a scientist, describes himself as not spiritual, but he wanted to explore concepts of death, reincarnation, and animal instinct. Harper recruited the cast and crew through Craigslist and other local websites.

== Release ==
Circulation premiered at the Another Hole in the Head Film Festival in San Francisco, California. It was theatrically released in November 2008. It was released on DVD on December 9, 2008.

== Reception ==
The film received mixed reviews. Mike Everleth of the Underground Film Journal says that a lot of the appeal of the film is how nicely Harper lets the film reveal itself. Gary Goldstein of the Los Angeles Times called it inept and muddled. LA Weekly wrote that its originality saves it from becoming dull due to the slow pacing. Cheryl Eddy of the San Francisco Bay Guardian called it slow-paced but enjoyable. Jeremy Blitz of DVD Talk rated it 2.5/5 stars and called it a "moody, hard to classify film that is often confusing, most of the time intentionally." David Johnson of DVD Verdict called it a bizarre, original film that comes close to being too pretentious. Travis Keune of We Are Movie Geeks says that Harper shows that even with a limited budget, he can still stretch that dollar by utilizing creativity, ingenuity and a clear understanding of what it takes to make an interesting movie. Scott Larson wrote that there is a bit of magic realism going on here, and the unsettling sense of dreaming and the strange noises on the soundtrack remind us a bit of David Lynch. The David Lynch comparison was also made by Film Apocalypse who writes, "From a viewer's perspective, the story seems much more natural in the beginning and only slowly moves into a strange and eerie, David Lynch style as the movie progresses."
