= Renewable fuels =

Fuels produced from renewable resources

Renewable fuels are fuels produced from renewable resources. Examples include: biofuels (e.g. Vegetable oil used as fuel, ethanol, methanol from clean energy and carbon dioxide or biomass, and biodiesel), Hydrogen fuel (when produced with renewable processes), and fully synthetic fuel (also known as electrofuel) produced from ambient carbon dioxide and water. This is in contrast to non-renewable fuels such as natural gas, LPG (propane), petroleum and other fossil fuels and nuclear energy. Renewable fuels can include fuels that are synthesized from renewable energy sources, such as wind and solar. Renewable fuels have gained in popularity due to their sustainability, low contributions to the carbon cycle, and in some cases lower amounts of greenhouse gases. The geo-political ramifications of these fuels are also of interest, particularly to industrialized economies which desire independence from Middle Eastern oil.

== Rationale for renewable fuels ==
The International Energy Agency's World Energy Outlook 2006 concludes that rising oil demand, if left unchecked, would accentuate the consuming countries' vulnerability to a severe supply disruption and resulting price shock. Renewable biofuels for transport represent a key source of diversification from petroleum products. Biofuels from grain and beet in temperate regions have a part to play, but they are relatively expensive and their energy efficiency and CO_{2} savings benefits, are variable. Biofuels from sugar cane and other highly productive tropical crops are much more competitive and beneficial. But all first generation biofuels ultimately compete with food production for land, water, and other resources. Greater efforts are required to develop and commercialize second generation biofuel technologies, such as biorefineries and ligno-cellulosics, enabling the flexible production of biofuels and other products from non-edible plant materials.

Hubbert's peak oil theory suggests that petroleum is a finite resource that is rapidly depleting. Of the worldwide total remaining petroleum reserves of approximately 1,277,702,000,000 barrels (203.1384 km^{3}) (about one half of the original virgin reserves) and a worldwide usage rate of 25,000,000,000 barrels (4.0 km^{3}) per year, only about 50 years worth of petroleum is predicted to remain at the current depletion rate. Petroleum is imperative for the following industries: fuel (home heating, jet fuel, gasoline, diesel, etc.) transportation, agriculture, pharmaceutical, plastics/resins, man-made fibers, synthetic rubber, and explosives. If the modern world remains reliant on petroleum as a source of energy, the price of crude oil could increase markedly, destabilizing economies worldwide. Consequently, renewable fuel drivers include: high oil prices, imbalance of trade, instability in oil exporting regions of the world, the Energy Policy Act of 2005, the potential for windfall profits for American farmers and industries, avoidance of economic depression, avoidance of scarcity of products due to a volatile ‘peak oil’ scenario expected to begin as early as 2021, (though peak oil is not a new idea) and a slowing of global warming that may usher in unprecedented climate change.

Furthermore, the conclusion that anthropogenic greenhouse gas emissions are causing climate change, along with regional geopolitical instabilities have challenged nations to act to develop both alternative and carbon-neutral sources of energy. Renewable fuels are therefore becoming attractive to many governments, who are beginning to see sustainable energy independence as a valuable asset.

On December 19, 2007, President Bush signed into law the Energy Independence and Security Act, establishing a requirement that at least 36 billion US gallons (140,000,000 m^{3}) of renewable fuel be used in the marketplace by 2022.

According to the International Energy Agency (IEA), cellulosic ethanol commercialization could allow ethanol fuels to play a much larger role in the future than previously thought. Cellulosic ethanol can be made from plant matter composed primarily of inedible cellulose fibers that form the stems and branches of most plants. Dedicated energy crops, such as switchgrass, are also promising cellulose sources that can be produced in many regions of the United States.

== Biofuel ==
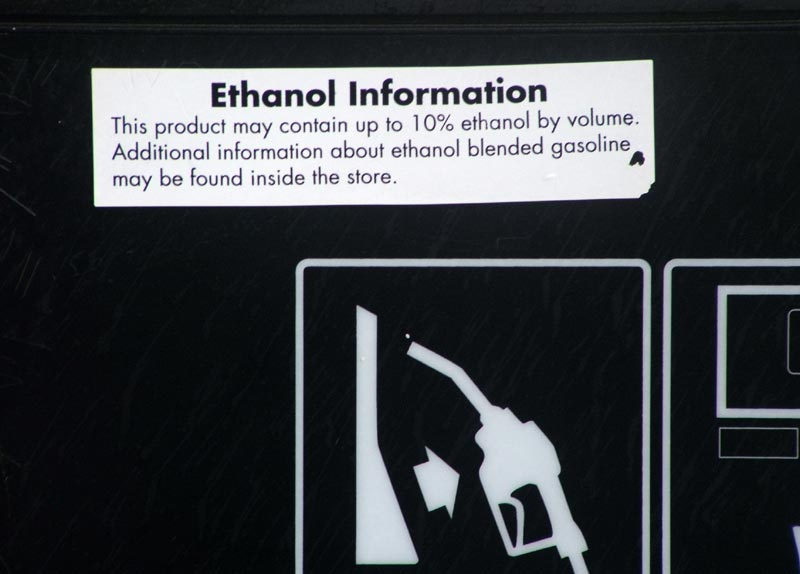
Information on pump regarding ethanol fuel blend up to 10%, California

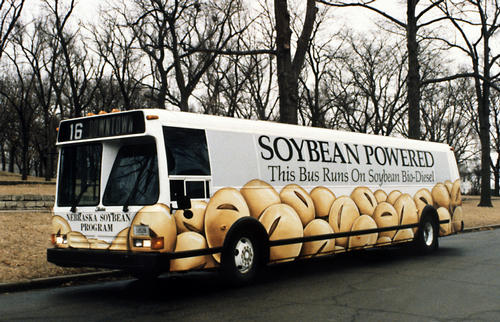
A bus fueled by biodiesel

Biofuel is a type of fuel whose energy is derived from biological carbon fixation. Biofuels include fuels derived from biomass conversion, as well as solid biomass, liquid fuels and various biogases. Although fossil fuels have their origin in ancient carbon fixation, they are not considered biofuels by the generally accepted definition because they contain carbon that has been "out" of the carbon cycle for a very long time. Biofuels are gaining increased public and scientific attention, driven by factors such as oil price spikes, the need for increased energy security, concern over greenhouse gas emissions from fossil fuels, and support from government subsidies.

Bioethanol is an alcohol made by fermentation, mostly from carbohydrates produced in sugar or starch crops such as corn or sugar cane. Cellulosic biomass, derived from non-food sources such as trees and grasses, is also being developed as a feedstock for ethanol production. Ethanol can be used as a fuel for vehicles in its pure form, but it is usually used as a gasoline additive to increase octane and improve vehicle emissions. Bioethanol is widely used in the USA and in Brazil. Current plant design does not provide for converting the lignin portion of plant raw materials to fuel components by fermentation.

Biodiesel is made from vegetable oils and animal fats. Biodiesel can be used as a fuel for vehicles in its pure form, but it is usually used as a diesel additive to reduce levels of particulates, carbon monoxide, and hydrocarbons from diesel-powered vehicles. Biodiesel is produced from oils or fats using transesterification and is the most common biofuel in Europe.

In 2010 worldwide biofuel production reached 105 billion liters (28 billion gallons US), up 17% from 2009, and biofuels provided 2.7% of the world's fuels for road transport, a contribution largely made up of ethanol and biodiesel. Global ethanol fuel production reached 86 billion liters (23 billion gallons US) in 2010, with the United States and Brazil as the world's top producers, accounting together for 90% of global production. The world's largest biodiesel producer is the European Union, accounting for 53% of all biodiesel production in 2010. As of 2011, mandates for blending biofuels exist in 31 countries at the national level and in 29 states/provinces. According to the International Energy Agency, biofuels have the potential to meet more than a quarter of world demand for transportation fuels by 2050.

Pyrolysis oil is another type of fuel derived from the lignocellulosic fraction of biomass. By rapidly heating biomass in the absence of oxygen (pyrolysis), a liquid crude can be formed that can be further processed into a usable bio-oil. As opposed to other biofuels, pyrolysis oils use the non-edible fraction of biomass and can occur on the order of milliseconds and without the need for large fermentation reactors.

== Hydrogen fuel ==
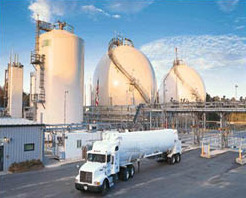
Hydrogen fuel requires the development of a specific infrastructure for processing, transport and storage.

Hydrogen fuel refers to the use of hydrogen gas (H_{2}) as an energy carrier. Broadly speaking, the production of renewable hydrogen fuel can be divided into two general categories: biologically derived production, and chemical production. This is an area of current research, and new developments and technologies are causing this field to evolve rapidly.

The biological production of hydrogen fuel has been a topic of research since at least the 1970s. Hydrogen gas can be produced from biomass sources like agricultural and forest residues, consumer waste, and other specific agricultural crops. Specifically, hydrogen fuel is produced by a process called gasification, where biomass is processed into combustible gas and then burned, or by pyrolysis, a related process which can lead to hydrogen gas suitable for fuel-cell applications. One continuing subject of research regards the production of unwanted co-products in both of these processes. The presence of other contaminant gases often depends on the specific composition of the biomass source, which can be difficult to control. Another source for biological production of hydrogen fuel is algae. In the late 1990s, it was discovered that if algae are deprived of sulfur they will switch from the production of oxygen, as in normal photosynthesis, to the production of hydrogen. Experimental algae farms are attempting to make algae an economically feasible energy source.

There are also several physico-chemical methods for producing hydrogen; most of these methods require electrolysis of water. When this process draws its power from renewable energy sources like wind turbines or photovoltaic cells, the production requires little consumption of non-renewable resources. Hydrogen fuel, when produced by renewable sources of energy like wind or solar power, is a renewable fuel known as green hydrogen.

== Synthetic fuel (electrofuel) ==
Electrofuels, also known as e-fuels or synthetic fuels, are a type of drop-in replacement fuel. They are manufactured using captured carbon dioxide or carbon monoxide, together with hydrogen obtained from sustainable electricity sources such as wind, solar and nuclear power.

The process uses carbon dioxide in manufacturing and releases around the same amount of carbon dioxide into the air when the fuel is burned, for an overall low carbon footprint. Electrofuels are thus an option for reducing greenhouse gas emissions from transport, particularly for long-distance freight, marine, and air transport. Several emerging companies are developing products in this space, including British company Zero, which is building a development production plant at Bicester Heritage near Oxford.

== Processed engineered fuel ==
Processed engineered fuels (PEFs) are combustible feedstock (usually pellets) selected and processed from suitable waste (such as polyethylene, polypropylene paper &c.) often obtained from landfill trash. PEFs offer substitute or a partial replacement for fossil fuels. PEFs can have significant calorific value and may be used as a fuel substitute for coal and gas in high-combustion facilities.

=== Abbreviations ===
- APC American Plastics Council
- Bevill waste exclusion (USA)
- BTU British Thermal Unit (0.29307107 Watts)
- EPA Environment Protection Agency (USA)
- HHV Higher Heating Value
- IWSA Integrated Waste Services Association (USA)
- MWC Municipal Waste Combustor
- MSW Municipal Solid Waste
- PDF Packaging Derived Fuel
- PEF Processed Engineered Fuels
- PPDF Plastic Packaging Derived Fuel
- QC Quality Control
- RDF Refuse Derived Fuel
- TLPC Toxicity characteristic leaching procedure
- WTE Waste to Energy

== See also ==
- Electrofuel
- IRENA
- Power to gas
- Renewable natural gas
- Solar fuel
- Syngas
