= Proton-exchange membrane fuel cell =

Power generation technology

Diagram of a PEM fuel cell

Proton-exchange membrane fuel cells (PEMFC), also known as polymer electrolyte membrane (PEM) fuel cells, are a type of fuel cell being developed mainly for transport applications, as well as for stationary fuel-cell applications and portable fuel-cell applications. Their distinguishing features include lower temperature/pressure ranges (50 to 100 °C) and a special proton-conducting polymer electrolyte membrane. PEMFCs generate electricity and operate on the opposite principle to PEM electrolysis, which consumes electricity. They are a leading candidate to replace the aging alkaline fuel-cell technology, which was used in the Space Shuttle.

== Science ==
PEMFCs are built out of membrane electrode assemblies (MEA) which include the electrodes, electrolyte, catalyst, and gas diffusion layers. An ink of catalyst, carbon, and electrode are sprayed or painted onto the solid electrolyte and carbon paper is hot pressed on either side to protect the inside of the cell and also act as electrodes. The pivotal part of the cell is the triple phase boundary (TPB) where the electrolyte, catalyst, and reactants mix and thus where the cell reactions actually occur. Importantly, the membrane must not be electrically conductive so the half reactions do not mix. Operating temperatures above 100 °C are desired so the water byproduct becomes steam and water management becomes less critical in cell design.

=== Reactions ===
A proton exchange membrane fuel cell transforms the chemical energy liberated during the electrochemical reaction of hydrogen and oxygen to electrical energy, as opposed to the direct combustion of hydrogen and oxygen gases to produce thermal energy.

A stream of hydrogen is delivered to the anode side of the MEA. At the anode side it is catalytically split into protons and electrons. This oxidation half-cell reaction or hydrogen oxidation reaction (HOR) is represented by:

At the anode:

$\ce{H2 -> 2H+ + 2e-}$ $E^{\circ} = 0\,\mathrm{V}\,\,\,\frac{\mathrm{d}E^{\circ}}{\mathrm{d}T} = 0\,\mathrm{mV\,K^{-1}}$	1

The newly formed protons permeate through the polymer electrolyte membrane to the cathode side. The electrons travel along an external load circuit to the cathode side of the MEA, thus creating the current output of the fuel cell. Meanwhile, a stream of oxygen is delivered to the cathode side of the MEA. At the cathode side oxygen molecules react with the protons permeating through the polymer electrolyte membrane and the electrons arriving through the external circuit to form water molecules. This reduction half-cell reaction or oxygen reduction reaction (ORR) is represented by:

At the cathode:

$\ce{\frac{1}{2}O2 + 2H+ + 2e- -> H2O}$ $E^{\circ} = 1.2291\,\mathrm{V}\,\,\,\frac{\mathrm{d}E^{\circ}}{\mathrm{d}T} = -0.8456\,\mathrm{mV\,K^{-1}}$	2

Overall reaction:

$\ce{H2 + \frac{1}{2}O2 -> H2O}$ $E^{\circ} = 1.2291\,\mathrm{V}\,\,\,\frac{\mathrm{d}E^{\circ}}{\mathrm{d}T} = -0.8456\,\mathrm{mV\,K^{-1}}$	3

The reversible reaction is expressed in the equation and shows the reincorporation of the hydrogen protons and electrons together with the oxygen molecule and the formation of one water molecule. The potentials in each case are given with respect to the standard hydrogen electrode.

=== Polymer electrolyte membrane ===
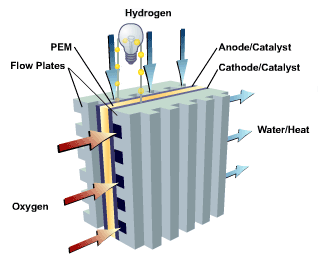

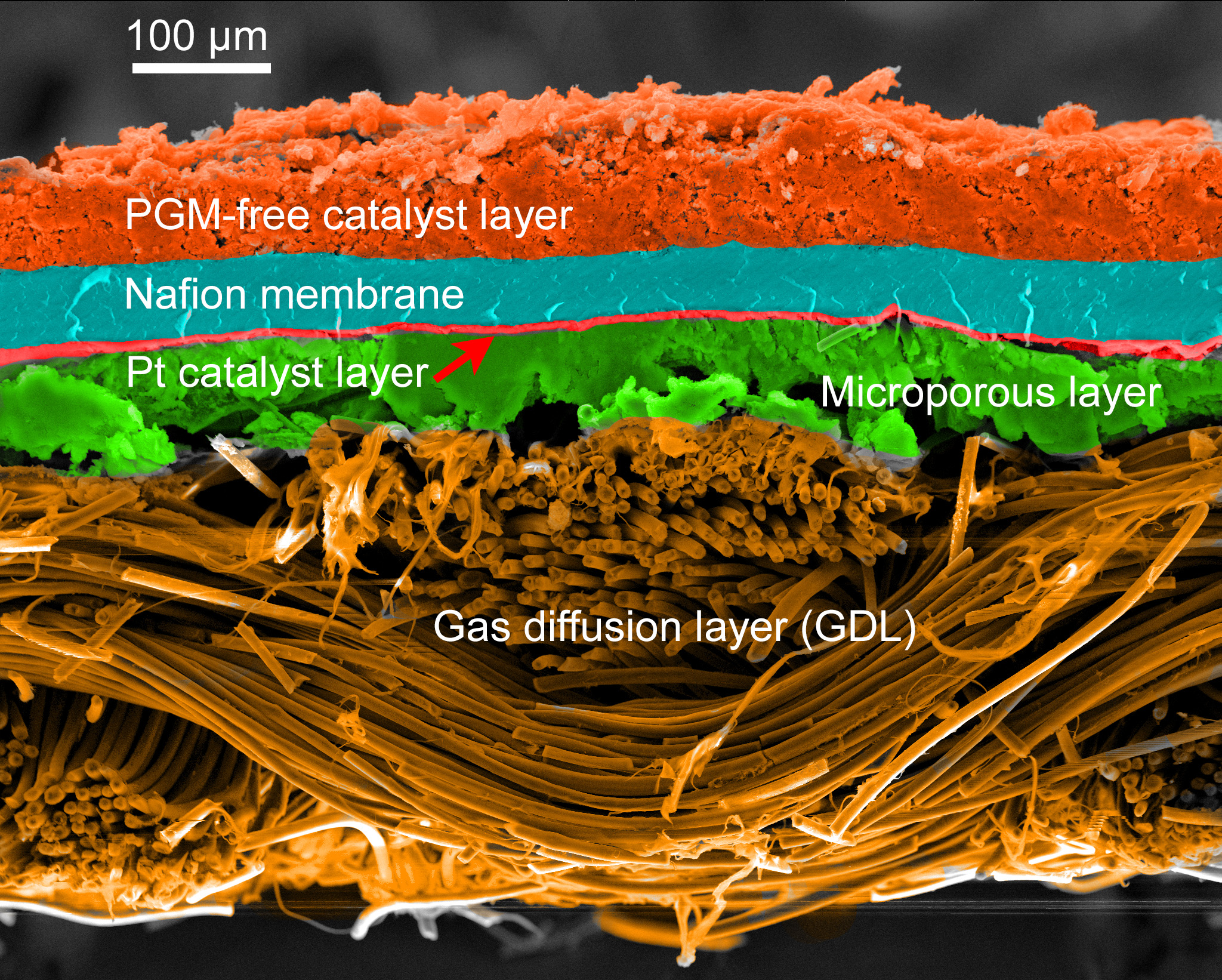
SEM micrograph of a PEMFC MEA cross-section with a non-precious metal catalyst cathode and Pt/C anode. False colors applied for clarity.

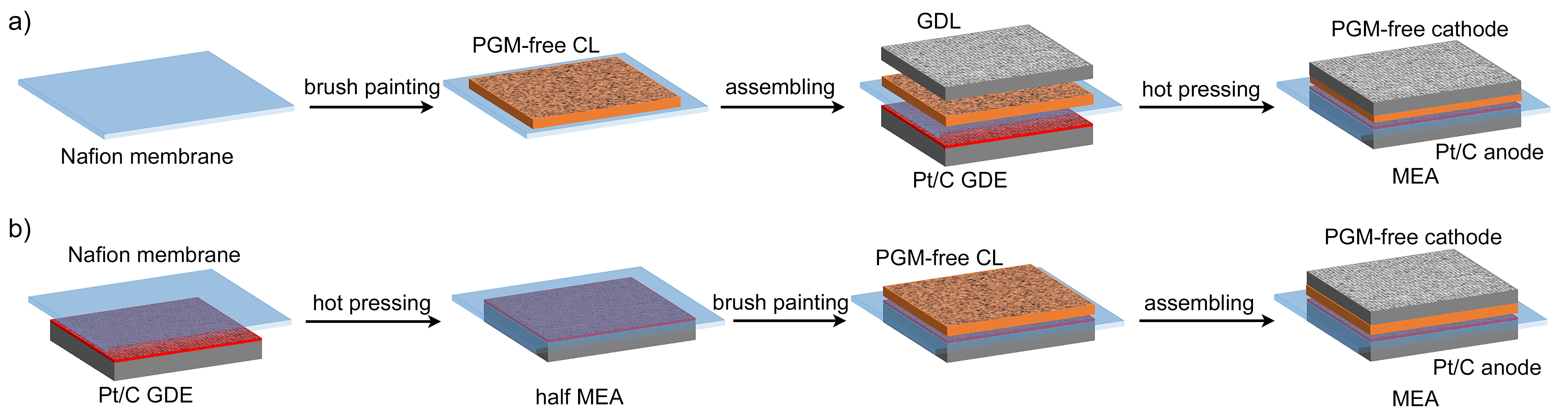
MEA fabrication methods for PEMFC

To function, the membrane must conduct hydrogen ions (protons) but not electrons as this would in effect "short circuit" the fuel cell. The membrane must also not allow either gas to pass to the other side of the cell, a problem known as gas crossover. Finally, the membrane must be resistant to the reducing environment at the cathode as well as the harsh oxidative environment at the anode.

Splitting of the hydrogen molecule is relatively easy by using a platinum catalyst. Unfortunately however, splitting the oxygen molecule is more difficult, and this causes significant electric losses. An appropriate catalyst material for this process has not been discovered, and platinum is the best option.

==== Strengths ====
===== Easy sealing =====
PEMFCs have a thin, polymeric membrane as the electrolyte. This membrane is located in between the anode and cathode catalyst layers and allows the passage of protons to pass to the cathode while restricting the passage of electrons. The better the connection of the polymeric membrane to the catalyst layer, the lower the interface resistance. Compared to liquid electrolytes, a polymeric membrane has a much lower chance of leakage. The membrane is commonly made of materials such as perfluorosulfonic acid (PFSA, sold commercially as Nafion and Aquivion), which minimize gas crossover and short circuiting of the fuel cell. A disadvantage of fluor containing polymers is the fact that during production (and disposal) PFAS products are formed. PFAS, the so-called forever chemicals, are highly toxic. Newer polymers such as the recently patented SPX3 are fluor free and therefore do not carry the PFAS risk.

===== Low Operating Temperature =====
Under extreme sub-freezing conditions, the water produced by fuel cells can freeze in porous layers and flow channels. This freezing water can block gas and fuel transport as well as cover catalyst reaction sites, resulting in a loss of output power and a start-up failure of the fuel cell.

However, the low operating temperature of a PEM fuel cell allows it to reach a suitable temperature with less heating compared to other types of fuel cells. With this approach, PEM fuel cells have been shown to be capable of cold start processes from −20°C.

===== Light mass and high power density (transport applications) =====
PEM fuel cells have been shown to be capable of high power densities up to 39.7 kW/kg, compared to 2.5 kW/kg for solid oxide fuel cells. Due to this high power density, much research is being done on potential applications in transportation as well as wearable technology.

==== Weaknesses ====
Fuel Cells based on PEM still have many issues:

===== Water management =====
Water management is crucial to performance: if water is evaporated too slowly, it will flood the membrane and the accumulation of water inside of field flow plate will impede the flow of oxygen into the fuel cell, but if water evaporates too fast, the membrane will dry and the resistance across it increases. Both cases will cause damage to stability and power output. Water management is a very difficult subject in PEM systems, primarily because water in the membrane is attracted toward the cathode of the cell through polarization.

A wide variety of solutions for managing the water exist including integration of an electroosmotic pump.

Another innovative method to resolve the water recirculation problem is the 3D fine mesh flow field design used in the Toyota Mirai, 2014. Conventional design of FC stack recirculates water from the air outlet to the air inlet through a humidifier with a straight channel and porous metal flow fields^{[54]}.The flow field is a structure made up of a rib and channels. However, the rib partially covers the gas diffusion layer (GDL) and the resultant gas-transport distance is longer than the inter-channel distance. Furthermore, the contact pressure between the GDL and the rib also compresses the GDL, making its thickness non-uniform across the rib and channel^{[55]}. The large width and non-uniform thickness of the rib will increase potential for water vapor to accumulate and the oxygen will be compromised. As a result, oxygen will be impeded to diffuse into catalyst layer, leading to nonuniform power generation in the FC.

This new design enabled the first FC stack functions without a humidifying system meanwhile overcoming water recirculation issues and achieving high power output stability^{[54]}. The 3D micro lattice allows more pathways for gas flow; therefore, it promotes airflow toward membrane electrode and gas diffusion layer assembly (MEGA) and promotes O2 diffusion to the catalyst layer. Unlike conventional flow fields, the 3D micro-lattices in the complex field, which act as baffles and induce frequent micro-scale interfacial flux between the GDL and flow-fields^{[53]}. Due to this repeating micro-scale convective flow, oxygen transport to catalyst layer (CL) and liquid water removal from GDL is significantly enhanced. The generated water is quickly drawn out through the flow field, preventing accumulation within the pores. As a result, the power generation from this flow field is uniform across the cross-section and self-humidification is enabled.

===== Vulnerability of the Catalyst =====
The platinum catalyst on the membrane is easily poisoned by carbon monoxide, which is often present in product gases formed by methane reforming (no more than one part per million is usually acceptable). This generally necessitates the use of the water gas shift reaction to eliminate CO from product gases and form more hydrogen. Additionally, the membrane is sensitive to the presences of metal ions, which may impair proton conduction mechanisms and can be introduced by corrosion of metallic bipolar plates, metallic components in the fuel cell system or from contaminants in the fuel/oxidant.

PEM systems that use reformed methanol were proposed, as in Daimler Chrysler Necar 5; reforming methanol, i.e. making it react to obtain hydrogen, is however a very complicated process, that also requires purification from the carbon monoxide the reaction produces. A platinum-ruthenium catalyst is necessary as some carbon monoxide will unavoidably reach the membrane. The level should not exceed 10 parts per million. Furthermore, the start-up times of such a reformer reactor are of about half an hour. Alternatively, methanol, and some other biofuels can be fed to a PEM fuel cell directly without being reformed, thus making a direct methanol fuel cell (DMFC). These devices operate with limited success.

===== Limitation of Operating Temperature =====
The most commonly used membrane is Nafion by Chemours, which relies on liquid water humidification of the membrane to transport protons. This implies that it is not feasible to use temperatures above 80 to 90 °C, since the membrane would dry. Other, more recent membrane types, based on polybenzimidazole (PBI) or phosphoric acid, can reach up to 220 °C without using any water management (see also High Temperature Proton Exchange Membrane fuel cell, HT-PEMFC): higher temperature allow for better efficiencies, power densities, ease of cooling (because of larger allowable temperature differences), reduced sensitivity to carbon monoxide poisoning and better controllability (because of absence of water management issues in the membrane); however, these recent types are not as common. PBI can be doped with phosphoric or sulfuric acid and the conductivity scales with amount of doping and temperature. At high temperatures, it is difficult to keep Nafion hydrated, but this acid doped material does not use water as a medium for proton conduction. It also exhibits better mechanical properties, higher strength, than Nafion and is cheaper. However, acid leaching is a considerable issue and processing, mixing with catalyst to form ink, has proved tricky. Aromatic polymers, such as PEEK, are far cheaper than Teflon (PTFE and backbone of Nafion) and their polar character leads to hydration that is less temperature dependent than Nafion. However, PEEK is far less ionically conductive than Nafion and thus is a less favorable electrolyte choice. Recently, protic ionic liquids and protic organic ionic plastic crystals have been shown as promising alternative electrolyte materials for high temperature (100–200 °C) PEMFCs.

==== Electrodes ====
An electrode typically consists of carbon support, Pt particles, Nafion ionomer, and/or Teflon binder. The carbon support functions as an electrical conductor; the Pt particles are reaction sites; the ionomer provides paths for proton conduction, and the Teflon binder increases the hydrophobicity of the electrode to minimize potential flooding. In order to enable the electrochemical reactions at the electrodes, protons, electrons and the reactant gases (hydrogen or oxygen) must gain access to the surface of the catalyst in the electrodes, while the product water, which can be in either liquid or gaseous phase, or both phases, must be able to permeate from the catalyst to the gas outlet. These properties are typically realized by porous composites of polymer electrolyte binder (ionomer) and catalyst nanoparticles supported on carbon particles. Typically platinum is used as the catalyst for the electrochemical reactions at the anode and cathode, while nanoparticles realize high surface to weight ratios (as further described below) reducing the amount of the costly platinum. The polymer electrolyte binder provides the ionic conductivity, while the carbon support of the catalyst improves the electric conductivity and enables low platinum metal loading. The electric conductivity in the composite electrodes is typically more than 40 times higher as the proton conductivity.

==== Gas diffusion layer ====
The GDL electrically connects the catalyst and current collector. It must be porous, electrically conductive, and thin. The reactants must be able to reach the catalyst, but conductivity and porosity can act as opposing forces. Optimally, the GDL should be composed of about one third Nafion or 15% PTFE. The carbon particles used in the GDL can be larger than those employed in the catalyst because surface area is not the most important variable in this layer. GDL should be around 15–35 μm thick to balance needed porosity with mechanical strength. Often, an intermediate porous layer is added between the GDL and catalyst layer to ease the transitions between the large pores in the GDL and small porosity in the catalyst layer. Since a primary function of the GDL is to help remove water, a product, flooding can occur when water effectively blocks the GDL. This limits the reactants ability to access the catalyst and significantly decreases performance. Teflon can be coated onto the GDL to limit the possibility of flooding. Several microscopic variables are analyzed in the GDLS such as: porosity, tortuosity and permeability. These variables have incidence over the behavior of the fuel cells.

==== Efficiency ====
The maximal theoretical efficiency applying the Gibbs free energy equation ΔG = −237.13 kJ/mol and using the heating value of Hydrogen (ΔH = −285.84 kJ/mol) is 83% at 298 K.

$$\eta = \frac{\Delta G}{\Delta H} = 1 - \frac{T\Delta S}{\Delta H}$$

The practical efficiency of a PEMs is in the range of 50–60% . Main factors that create losses are:

- Activation losses
- Ohmic losses
- Mass transport losses

=== Bipolar plates ===
The external electrodes, often referred to as bipolar plates or backplates, serve to distribute fuel and oxygen uniformly to the catalysts, to remove water, to collect and transmit electric current. Thus, they need to be in close contact with the catalyst. Because the plates are in contact with both PEM and catalyst layers, the backplate needs to be structurally tough and leakage-resistant in case of structural failure due to fuel cell vibration and temperature cycling. As fuel cells operate in wide ranges of temperatures and in highly reductive/oxidative environments, plates must have high surface tolerances over the wide ranges of temperatures and should be chemically stable. Since the backplate accounts for more than three-quarters of the fuel cell mass, the material must also be lightweight to maximize the energy density.

Materials that fulfill all of these requirements are often very expensive. Gold has been shown to fulfill these criteria well, but is only used for small production volumes due to its high cost. Titanium nitride (TiN) is a cheaper material that is used in fuel cell backplates due to its high chemical stability, electrical conductivity, and corrosion resistance. However, defects in the TiN coating can easily lead to corrosion of the underlying material, most commonly steel.

To perform their main function of distributing gas and fuel, these plates often have straight, parallel channels across its surface. However, this simple approach has led to issues such as uneven pressure distribution, water droplets blocking gas flow, and output power oscillations. Innovative approaches, such as nature-inspired fractal models and computer simulations are being explored to optimize the function of these bipolar plates.

=== Metal-organic frameworks ===
Metal-organic frameworks (MOFs) are a relatively new class of porous, highly crystalline materials that consist of metal nodes connected by organic linkers. Due to the simplicity of manipulating or substituting the metal centers and ligands, there are a virtually limitless number of possible combinations, which is attractive from a design standpoint. MOFs exhibit many unique properties due to their tunable pore sizes, thermal stability, high volume capacities, large surface areas, and desirable electrochemical characteristics. Among their many diverse uses, MOFs are promising candidates for clean energy applications such as hydrogen storage, gas separations, supercapacitors, Li-ion batteries, solar cells, and fuel cells. Within the field of fuel cell research, MOFs are being studied as potential electrolyte materials and electrode catalysts that could someday replace traditional polymer membranes and Pt catalysts, respectively.

As electrolyte materials, the inclusion of MOFs seems at first counter-intuitive. Fuel cell membranes generally have low porosity to prevent fuel crossover and loss of voltage between the anode and cathode. Additionally, membranes tend to have low crystallinity because the transport of ions is more favorable in disordered materials. On the other hand, pores can be filled with additional ion carriers that ultimately enhance the ionic conductivity of the system and high crystallinity makes the design process less complex.

The general requirements of a good electrolyte for PEMFCs are: high proton conductivity (>10^{−2} S/cm for practical applications) to enable proton transport between electrodes, good chemical and thermal stability under fuel cell operating conditions (environmental humidity, variable temperatures, resistance to poisonous species, etc.), low cost, ability to be processed into thin-films, and overall compatibility with other cell components. While polymeric materials are currently the preferred choice of proton-conducting membrane, they require humidification for adequate performance and can sometimes physically degrade due to hydrations effects, thereby causing losses of efficiency. As mentioned, Nafion is also limited by a dehydration temperature of < 100 °C, which can lead to slower reaction kinetics, poor cost efficiency, and CO poisoning of Pt electrode catalysts. Conversely, MOFs have shown encouraging proton conductivities in both low and high temperature regimes as well as over a wide range of humidity conditions. Below 100 °C and under hydration, the presence of hydrogen bonding and solvent water molecules aid in proton transport, whereas anhydrous conditions are suitable for temperatures above 100 °C. MOFs also have the distinct advantage of exhibiting proton conductivity by the framework itself in addition to the inclusion of charge carries (i.e., water, acids, etc.) into their pores.

A low temperature example is work by Kitagawa, et al. who used a two-dimensional oxalate-bridged anionic layer framework as the host and introduced ammonium cations and adipic acid molecules into the pores to increase proton concentration. The result was one of the first instances of a MOF showing "superprotonic" conductivity (8 × 10^{−3} S/cm) at 25 °C and 98% relative humidity (RH). They later found that increasing the hydrophilic nature of the cations introduced into the pores could enhance proton conductivity even more. In this low temperature regime that is dependent on degree of hydration, it has also been shown that proton conductivity is heavily dependent on humidity levels.

A high temperature anhydrous example is PCMOF2, which consists of sodium ions coordinated to a trisulfonated benzene derivative. To improve performance and allow for higher operating temperatures, water can be replaced as the proton carrier by less volatile imidazole or triazole molecules within the pores. The maximum temperature achieved was 150 °C with an optimum conductivity of 5 × 10^{−4} S/cm, which is lower than other current electrolyte membranes. However, this model holds promise for its temperature regime, anhydrous conditions, and ability to control the quantity of guest molecules within the pores, all of which allowed for the tunability of proton conductivity. Additionally, the triazole-loaded PCMOF2 was incorporated into a H_{2}/air membrane-electrode assembly and achieved an open circuit voltage of 1.18 V at 100 °C that was stable for 72 hours and managed to remain gas tight throughout testing. This was the first instance that proved MOFs could actually be implemented into functioning fuel cells, and the moderate potential difference showed that fuel crossover due to porosity was not an issue.

To date, the highest proton conductivity achieved for a MOF electrolyte is 4.2 × 10^{−2} S/cm at 25 °C under humid conditions (98% RH), which is competitive with Nafion. Some recent experiments have even successfully produced thin-film MOF membranes instead of the traditional bulk samples or single crystals, which is crucial for their industrial applicability. Once MOFs are able to consistently achieve sufficient conductivity levels, mechanical strength, water stability, and simple processing, they have the potential to play an important role in PEMFCs in the near future.

MOFs have also been targeted as potential replacements of platinum group metal (PGM) materials for electrode catalysts, although this research is still in the early stages of development. In PEMFCs, the oxygen reduction reaction (ORR) at the Pt cathode is significantly slower than the fuel oxidation reaction at the anode, and thus non-PGM and metal-free catalysts are being investigated as alternatives. The high volumetric density, large pore surface areas, and openness of metal-ion sites in MOFs make them ideal candidates for catalyst precursors. Despite promising catalytic abilities, the durability of these proposed MOF-based catalysts is currently less than desirable and the ORR mechanism in this context is still not completely understood.

=== Catalyst research ===
Much of the current research on catalysts for PEM fuel cells can be classified as having one of the following main objectives:

1. to obtain higher catalytic activity than the standard carbon-supported platinum particle catalysts used in current PEM fuel cells
2. to reduce the poisoning of PEM fuel cell catalysts by impurity gases
3. to reduce the cost of the fuel cell due to use of platinum-based catalysts
4. to enhance the ORR activity of platinum group metal-free electrocatalysts

An important parameter for a fair catalyst comparison and benchmarking is the electrochemical surface area (ECSA) which accounts for the actual catalyst surface that actively partake in redox reactions. Its knowledge is necessary for the assessment of catalyst activity (e.g. specific activity, mass activity) and the design of the electrode. One of the most used techniques for ECSA determination is CO stripping, which exploits the strong affinity of carbon monoxide to some metal electrocatalysts to assess the active area.

Examples of these approaches are given in the following sections.

==== Increasing catalytic activity ====
As mentioned above, platinum is by far the most effective element used for PEM fuel cell catalysts, and nearly all current PEM fuel cells use platinum particles on porous carbon supports to catalyze both hydrogen oxidation and oxygen reduction. However, due to their high cost, current Pt/C catalysts are not feasible for commercialization. The U.S. Department of Energy estimates that platinum-based catalysts will need to use roughly four times less platinum than is used in current PEM fuel cell designs in order to represent a realistic alternative to internal combustion engines. Consequently, one main goal of catalyst design for PEM fuel cells is to increase the catalytic activity of platinum by a factor of four so that only one-fourth as much of the precious metal is necessary to achieve similar performance.

One method of increasing the performance of platinum catalysts is to optimize the size and shape of the platinum particles. Decreasing the particles' size alone increases the total surface area of catalyst available to participate in reactions per volume of platinum used, but recent studies have demonstrated additional ways to make further improvements to catalytic performance. For example, one study reports that high-index facets of platinum nanoparticles (that is Miller indexes with large integers, such as Pt (730)) provide a greater density of reactive sites for oxygen reduction than typical platinum nanoparticles.

Since the most common and effective catalyst, platinum, is extremely expensive, alternative processing is necessary to maximize electrochemical surface area and minimize loading. Deposition of nanosized Pt particles onto carbon powder (Pt/C) provides a large Pt surface area while the carbon allows for electrical connection between the catalyst and the rest of the cell. Platinum is so effective because it has high activity and bonds to the hydrogen just strongly enough to facilitate electron transfer but not inhibit the hydrogen from continuing to move around the cell. However, platinum is less active in the cathode oxygen reduction reaction. This necessitates the use of more platinum, increasing the cell's expense and thus feasibility. Many potential catalyst choices are ruled out because of the extreme acidity of the cell.

The most effective ways of achieving the nanoscale Pt on carbon powder, which is currently the best option, are through vacuum deposition, sputtering, and electrodeposition. The platinum particles are deposited onto carbon paper that is permeated with PTFE. However, there is an optimal thinness to this catalyst layer, which limits the lower cost limit. Below 4 nm, Pt will form islands on the paper, limiting its activity. Above this thickness, the Pt will coat the carbon and be an effective catalyst. To further complicate things, Nafion cannot be infiltrated beyond 10 um, so using more Pt than this is an unnecessary expense. Thus the amount and shape of the catalyst is limited by the constraints of other materials.

A second method of increasing the catalytic activity of platinum is to alloy it with other metals. For example, it was recently shown that the Pt_{3}Ni(111) surface has a higher oxygen reduction activity than pure Pt(111) by a factor of ten. The authors attribute this dramatic performance increase to modifications to the electronic structure of the surface, reducing its tendency to bond to oxygen-containing ionic species present in PEM fuel cells and hence increasing the number of available sites for oxygen adsorption and reduction.

Further efficiencies can be realized using an Ultrasonic nozzle to apply the platinum catalyst to the electrolyte layer or to carbon paper under atmospheric conditions resulting in high efficiency spray. Studies have shown that due to the uniform size of the droplets created by this type of spray, due to the high transfer efficiency of the technology, due to the non-clogging nature of the nozzle and finally due to the fact that the ultrasonic energy de-agglomerates the suspension just before atomization, fuel cells MEA's manufactured this way have a greater homogeneity in the final MEA, and the gas flow through the cell is more uniform, maximizing the efficiency of the platinum in the MEA. Recent studies using inkjet printing to deposit the catalyst over the membrane have also shown high catalyst utilization due to the reduced thickness of the deposited catalyst layers.

Very recently, a new class of ORR electrocatalysts have been introduced in the case of Pt-M (M-Fe and Co) systems with an ordered intermetallic core encapsulated within a Pt-rich shell. These intermetallic core-shell (IMCS) nanocatalysts were found to exhibit an enhanced activity and most importantly, an extended durability compared to many previous designs. While the observed enhancement in the activities is ascribed to a strained lattice, the authors report that their findings on the degradation kinetics establish that the extended catalytic durability is attributable to a sustained atomic order.

==== Reducing poisoning ====
The other popular approach to improving catalyst performance is to reduce its sensitivity to impurities in the fuel source, especially carbon monoxide (CO). Presently, pure hydrogen gas is becoming economical to mass-produce by electrolysis. However, at the moment most hydrogen gas is produced by steam reforming light hydrocarbons, a process which produces a mixture of gases that also contains CO (1–3%), CO_{2} (19–25%), and N_{2} (25%). Even tens of parts per million of CO can poison a pure platinum catalyst, so increasing platinum's resistance to CO is an active area of research.

For example, one study reported that cube-shaped platinum nanoparticles with (100) facets displayed a fourfold increase in oxygen reduction activity compared to randomly faceted platinum nanoparticles of similar size. The authors concluded that the (111) facets of the randomly shaped nanoparticles bonded more strongly to sulfate ions than the (100) facets, reducing the number of catalytic sites open to oxygen molecules. The nanocubes they synthesized, in contrast, had almost exclusively (100) facets, which are known to interact with sulfate more weakly. This results in a significant increase of the electrochemical surface area, boosting the catalyst's oxygen reduction activity.

In addition, researchers have been investigating ways of reducing the CO content of hydrogen fuel before it enters a fuel cell as a possible way to avoid poisoning the catalysts. One recent study revealed that ruthenium-platinum core–shell nanoparticles are particularly effective at oxidizing CO to form CO_{2}, a much less harmful fuel contaminant. The mechanism that produces this effect is conceptually similar to that described for Pt_{3}Ni above: the ruthenium core of the particle alters the electronic structure of the platinum surface, rendering it better able to catalyze the oxidation of CO.

==== Lowering cost ====
The challenge for the viability of PEM fuel cells today still remains in their cost and stability. The high cost can in large part be attributed to the use of the precious metal of platinum in the catalyst layer of PEM cells. The electrocatalyst currently accounts for nearly half of the fuel cell stack cost. Although the Pt loading of PEM fuel cells has been reduced by two orders of magnitude over the past decade, further reduction is necessary to make the technology economically viable for commercialization. Whereas some research efforts aim to address this issue by improving the electrocatalytic activity of Pt-based catalysts, an alternative is to eliminate the use of Pt altogether by developing a non-platinum-group-metal (non-PGM) cathode catalyst whose performance rivals that of Pt-based technologies. The U.S. Department of Energy has been setting milestones for the development of fuel cells, targeting a durability of 5000 hours and a non-PGM catalyst ORR volumetric activity of 300 A cm^{−3}.

Promising alternatives to Pt-based catalysts are Metal/Nitrogen/ Carbon-catalysts (M/N/C-catalysts). To achieve high power density, or output of power over surface area of the cell, a volumetric activity of at least 1/10 that of Pt-based catalysts must be met, along with good mass transport properties. While M/N/C-catalysts still demonstrate poorer volumetric activities than Pt-based catalysts, the reduced costs of such catalysts allows for greater loading to compensate. However, increasing the loading of M/N/C-catalysts also renders the catalytic layer thicker, impairing its mass transport properties. In other words, H_{2}, O_{2}, protons, and electrons have greater difficulty in migrating through the catalytic layer, decreasing the voltage output of the cell. While high microporosity of the M/N/C catalytic network results in high volumetric activity, improved mass transport properties are instead associated to macroporosity of the network. These M/N/C materials are synthesized using high temperature pyrolysis and other high temperature treatments of precursors containing the metal, nitrogen, and carbon.

Recently, researchers have developed a Fe/N/C catalyst derived from iron (II) acetate (FeAc), phenanthroline (Phen), and a metal-organic-framework (MOF) host. The MOF is a Zn(II) zeolitic imidazolate framework (ZIF) called ZIF-8, which demonstrates a high microporous surface area and high nitrogen content conducive to ORR activity. The power density of the FeAc/Phen/ZIF-8-catalyst was found to be 0.75 W cm^{−2} at 0.6 V. This value is a significant improvement over the maximal 0.37 W cm^{−2} power density of previous M/N/C-catalysts and is much closer to matching the typical value of 1.0–1.2 W cm^{−2} for Pt-based catalysts with a Pt loading of 0.3 mg cm^{−2}. The catalyst also demonstrated a volumetric activity of 230 A·cm^{−3}, the highest value for non-PGM catalysts to date, approaching the U.S. Department of Energy milestone.

While the power density achieved by the novel FeAc/Phen/ZIF-8-catalyst is promising, its durability remains inadequate for commercial application. It is reported that the best durability exhibited by this catalyst still had a 15% drop in current density over 100 hours in H_{2}/air. Hence while the Fe-based non-PGM catalysts rival Pt-based catalysts in their electrocatalytic activity, there is still much work to be done in understanding their degradation mechanisms and improving their durability.

== Applications ==
The major application of PEM fuel cells focuses on transportation primarily because of their potential impact on the environment, e.g. the control of emission of the green house gases (GHG). Other applications include distributed/stationary and portable power generation. Most major motor companies work solely on PEM fuel cells due to their high power density and excellent dynamic characteristics as compared with other types of fuel cells. Due to their light weight, PEMFCs are most suited for transportation applications. PEMFCs for buses, which use compressed hydrogen for fuel, can operate at up to 40% efficiency. Generally PEMFCs are implemented on buses over smaller cars because of the available volume to house the system and store the fuel. Technical issues for transportation involve incorporation of PEMs into current vehicle technology and updating energy systems. Full fuel cell vehicles are not advantageous if hydrogen is sourced from fossil fuels; however, they become beneficial when implemented as hybrids. There is potential for PEMFCs to be used for stationary power generation, where they provide 5 kW at 30% efficiency; however, they run into competition with other types of fuel cells, mainly SOFCs and MCFCs. Whereas PEMFCs generally require high purity hydrogen for operation, other fuel cell types can run on methane and are thus more flexible systems. Therefore, PEMFCs are best for small scale systems until economically scalable pure hydrogen is available. Furthermore, PEMFCs have the possibility of replacing batteries for portable electronics, though integration of the hydrogen supply is a technical challenge particularly without a convenient location to store it within the device.

== History ==
Before the invention of PEM fuel cells, existing fuel cell types such as solid-oxide fuel cells were only applied in extreme conditions. Such fuel cells also required very expensive materials and could only be used for stationary applications due to their size. These issues were addressed by the PEM fuel cell. The PEM fuel cell was invented in the early 1960s by Willard Thomas Grubb and Leonard Niedrach of General Electric. Initially, sulfonated polystyrene membranes were used for electrolytes, but they were replaced in 1966 by Nafion ionomer, which proved to be superior in performance and durability to sulfonated polystyrene.

PEM fuel cells were used in the NASA Gemini series of spacecraft, but they were replaced by Alkaline fuel cells in the Apollo program and in the Space Shuttle. General Electric continued working on PEM cells and in the mid-1970s developed PEM water electrolysis technology for undersea life support, leading to the US Navy Oxygen Generating Plant. The British Royal Navy adopted this technology in early 1980s for their submarine fleet. In the late 1980s and early 1990s, Los Alamos National Lab and Texas A&M University experimented with ways to reduce the amount of platinum required for PEM cells.

Parallel with Pratt and Whitney Aircraft, General Electric developed the first proton exchange membrane fuel cells (PEMFCs) for the Gemini space missions in the early 1960s. The first mission to use PEMFCs was Gemini V. However, the Apollo space missions and subsequent Apollo-Soyuz, Skylab and Space Shuttle missions used fuel cells based on Bacon's design, developed by Pratt and Whitney Aircraft.

Extremely expensive materials were used and the fuel cells required very pure hydrogen and oxygen. Early fuel cells tended to require inconveniently high operating temperatures that were a problem in many applications. However, fuel cells were seen to be desirable due to the large amounts of fuel available (hydrogen and oxygen).

Despite their success in space programs, fuel cell systems were limited to space missions and other special applications, where high cost could be tolerated. It was not until the late 1980s and early 1990s that fuel cells became a real option for wider application base. Several pivotal innovations, such as low platinum catalyst loading and thin film electrodes, drove the cost of fuel cells down, making development of PEMFC systems more realistic. However, there is significant debate as to whether hydrogen fuel cells will be a realistic technology for use in automobiles or other vehicles. (See hydrogen economy.) A large part of PEMFC production is for the Toyota Mirai. The US Department of Energy estimates a 2016 price at $53/kW if 500,000 units per year were made.

== See also ==
- Dynamic hydrogen electrode
- Gas diffusion electrode
- Glossary of fuel cell terms
- High Temperature Proton Exchange Membrane fuel cell
- Hydrogen sulfide sensor
- Power-to-weight ratio
- Reversible hydrogen electrode
- Timeline of hydrogen technologies
