= Direct methanol fuel cell =

Type of fuel cell

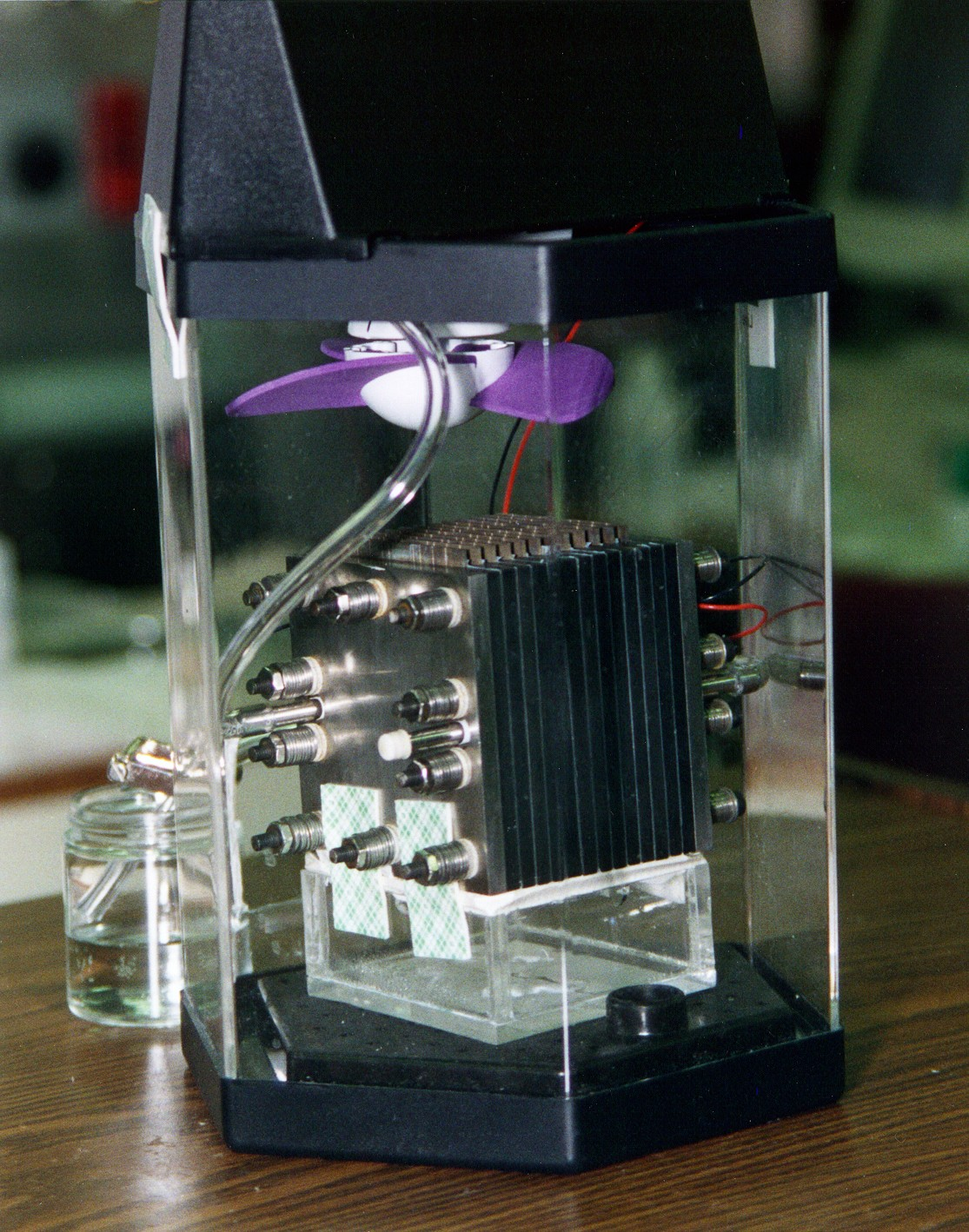
Direct methanol fuel cell

Direct methanol fuel cells or DMFCs are a subcategory of proton-exchange membrane fuel cells in which methanol is used as the fuel and a special proton-conducting polymer as the membrane (PEM). Their main advantage is in their low temperature operations and the ease of the transport of methanol, an energy-dense yet reasonably stable liquid at all environmental conditions.

Whilst the thermodynamic theoretical energy conversion efficiency of a DMFC is 97%; as of 2014 the achievable energy conversion efficiency for operational cells attains 30% – 40%. There is intensive research on promising approaches to increase the operational efficiency.

A more efficient version of a direct fuel cell would play a key role in the theoretical use of methanol as a general energy transport medium, in the hypothesized methanol economy.

== The cell ==
In contrast to indirect methanol fuel cells, where methanol is reacted to hydrogen by steam reforming, DMFCs use a methanol solution (usually around 1M, i.e. about 3% in mass) to carry the reactant into the cell; common operating temperatures are in the range 50 to 120 °C (122 to 248 °F), where high temperatures are usually pressurized. DMFCs themselves are more efficient at high temperatures and pressures, but these conditions end up causing so many losses in the complete system that the advantage is lost; therefore, atmospheric-pressure configurations are currently preferred.

Because of the methanol cross-over, a phenomenon by which methanol diffuses through the membrane without reacting, methanol is fed as a weak solution: this decreases efficiency significantly, since crossed-over methanol, after reaching the air side (the cathode), immediately reacts with air; though the exact kinetics are debated, the result is a reduction of the cell voltage. Cross-over remains a major factor in inefficiencies, and often half of the methanol is lost to cross-over. Methanol cross-over and/or its effects can be alleviated by (a) developing alternative membranes (e.g.), (b) improving the electro-oxidation process in the catalyst layer and improving the structure of the catalyst and gas diffusion layers (e.g. ), and (c) optimizing the design of the flow field and the membrane electrode assembly (MEA) which can be achieved by studying the current density distributions (e.g. ).

Other issues include the management of carbon dioxide created at the anode, the sluggish dynamic behavior, and the ability to maintain the solution water.

The only waste products with these types of fuel cells are carbon dioxide and water.

== Application ==
Current DMFCs are limited in the power that they can produce, but they can still store a high energy content in a small space. This means that they can produce a small amount of power over a long period of time. This makes them ill-suited for powering large vehicles (at least directly), but ideal for smaller vehicles such as forklifts and tuggers and consumer goods such as mobile phones, digital cameras or laptops. Military applications of DMFCs are an emerging application since they have low noise and thermal signatures and no toxic effluent. These applications include power for man-portable tactical equipment, battery chargers, and autonomous power for test and training instrumentation. Units are available with power outputs between 25 watts and 5 kilowatts with durations up to 100 hours between refuelings. Especially for power output up to 0.3 kW the DMFC is suitable. For a power output of more than 0.3 kW the indirect methanol fuel cell presents a higher efficiency and is more cost-efficient. Freezing of the liquid methanol-water mixture in the stack at low ambient temperature can be problematic for the membrane of DMFC (in contrast to indirect methanol fuel cell).

== Methanol ==
Methanol is a liquid from −97.6 to 64.7 °C (−143.7 to 148.5 °F) at atmospheric pressure. The volumetric energy density of methanol (15.9 MJ/L = 5.53 kWh/L) is an order of magnitude greater than even highly compressed hydrogen (0.5 - 0.59 kWh/L under 200 bars, LHV and HHV), about two times greater than liquid hydrogen (2.36 - 2.79 kWh/L, LHV and HHV) and 2.6 times higher than lithium-ion batteries. The energy density per mass (19.9 MJ/kg = 5.53 kWh/kg) is near a tenth of that of hydrogen (33.3 - 39.4 kWh/kg, LHV and HHV), but 10 times higher than that of lithium-ion batteries.

Methanol is slightly toxic and highly flammable. However, the International Civil Aviation Organization's (ICAO) Dangerous Goods Panel (DGP) voted in November 2005 to allow passengers to carry and use micro fuel cells and methanol fuel cartridges when aboard airplanes to power laptop computers and other consumer electronic devices. On September 24, 2007, the US Department of Transportation issued a proposal to allow airline passengers to carry fuel cell cartridges on board. The Department of Transportation issued a final ruling on April 30, 2008, permitting passengers and crew to carry an approved fuel cell with an installed methanol cartridge and up to two additional spare cartridges. It is worth noting that 200 ml maximum methanol cartridge volume allowed in the final ruling is double the 100 ml limit on liquids allowed by the Transportation Security Administration in carry-on bags.

== Reaction ==
The DMFC relies upon the oxidation of methanol on a catalyst layer to form carbon dioxide. Water is consumed at the anode and produced at the cathode. Protons (H^{+}) are transported across the proton exchange membrane - often made from Nafion - to the cathode where they react with oxygen to produce water. Electrons are transported through an external circuit from anode to cathode, providing power to connected devices.

The half-reactions are:

	Equation	
Anode	$\ce{{CH3OH} + H2O -> 6H+ + 6e- + {CO2}}$	oxidation
Cathode	$\ce{{\frac{3}{2} O2} + {6H+} + {6e^-} -> {3H2O}}$	reduction
Overall reaction	$\ce{{CH3OH} + \frac{3}{2} O2 -> 2H2O + {CO2}}$	redox reaction

Methanol and water are adsorbed on a catalyst usually made of platinum and ruthenium particles, and lose protons until carbon dioxide is formed. As water is consumed at the anode in the reaction, pure methanol cannot be used without provision of water via either passive transport such as back diffusion (osmosis), or active transport such as pumping. The need for water limits the energy density of the fuel.

Platinum is used as a catalyst for both half-reactions. This contributes to the loss of cell voltage potential, as any methanol that is present in the cathode chamber will oxidize. If another catalyst could be found for the reduction of oxygen, the problem of methanol crossover would likely be significantly lessened. Furthermore, platinum is very expensive and contributes to the high cost per kilowatt of these cells.

During the methanol oxidation reaction carbon monoxide (CO) is formed, which strongly adsorbs onto the platinum catalyst, reducing the number of available reaction sites and thus the performance of the cell. The addition of other metals, such as ruthenium or gold, to the platinum catalyst tends to ameliorate this problem. In the case of platinum-ruthenium catalysts, the oxophilic nature of ruthenium is believed to promote the formation of hydroxyl radicals on its surface, which can then react with carbon monoxide adsorbed on the platinum atoms. The water in the fuel cell is oxidized to a hydroxy radical via the following reaction: H_{2}O → OH• + H^{+} + e^{−}. The hydroxy radical then oxidizes carbon monoxide to produce carbon dioxide, which is released from the surface as a gas: CO + OH• → CO_{2} + H^{+} + e^{−}.

Using these OH groups in the half reactions, they are also expressed as:

	Equation	
Anode	$\ce{{CH3OH} + 6OH- -> 5H2O + 6e- + {CO2}}$	oxidation
Cathode	$\ce{{\frac{3}{2} O2} + {3H2O} + {6e^-} -> {6OH-}}$	reduction
Overall reaction	$\ce{{CH3OH} + \frac{3}{2} O2 -> 2H2O + {CO2}}$	redox reaction

=== Cross-over current ===
Methanol on the anodic side is usually in a weak solution (from 1M to 3M), because methanol in high concentrations has the tendency to diffuse through the membrane to the cathode, where its concentration is about zero because it is rapidly consumed by oxygen. Low concentrations help in reducing the cross-over, but also limit the maximum attainable current.

The practical realization is usually that a solution loop enters the anode, exits, is refilled with methanol, and returns to the anode again. Alternatively, fuel cells with optimized structures can be directly fed with high concentration methanol solutions or even pure methanol.

=== Water drag ===
The water in the anodic loop is lost because of the anodic reaction, but mostly because of the associated water drag: every proton formed at the anode drags a number of water molecules to the cathode. Depending on the temperature and membrane type, this number can be between 2 and 6.

== Ancillary units ==
A direct methanol fuel cell is usually part of a larger system including all the ancillary units that permit its operation. Compared to most other types of fuel cells, the ancillary system of DMFCs is relatively complex. The main reasons for its complexity are:

- providing water along with methanol would make the fuel supply more cumbersome, so water has to be recycled in a loop;
- CO_{2} has to be removed from the solution flow exiting the fuel cell;
- water in the anodic loop is slowly consumed by reaction and drag; it is necessary to recover water from the cathodic side to maintain steady operation.

== See also ==
- Alkali anion-exchange membrane
- Dynamic hydrogen electrode
- Fuel cell
- Glossary of fuel cell terms
- Liquid fuels
- Methanol (data page)
- Methanol economy
- Portable fuel cell applications
- Rudolf Schulten
- SymPowerco
