= Polyoxymethylene dimethyl ethers =

Identifiers
CAS Number	13353-03-2; 13352-75-5; 13352-76-6; 13352-77-7; 13353-04-3
3D model (JSmol)	Interactive image; Interactive image; Interactive image; Interactive image; Interactive image
ChemSpider	29577153; 29577150; 29577151; 26540223; 29577154
PubChem CID	58099115
- InChI: InChI=1S/C5H12O4/c1-6-3-8-5-9-4-7-2/h3-5H2,1-2H3; InChI=1S/C6H14O5/c1-7-3-9-5-11-6-10-4-8-2/h3-6H2,1-2H3; InChI=1S/C7H16O6/c1-8-3-10-5-12-7-13-6-11-4-9-2/h3-7H2,1-2H3; InChI=1S/C8H18O7/c1-9-3-11-5-13-7-15-8-14-6-12-4-10-2/h3-8H2,1-2H3; InChI=1S/C9H20O8/c1-10-3-12-5-14-7-16-9-17-8-15-6-13-4-11-2/h3-9H2,1-2H3
- SMILES: COCOCOCOC; COCOCOCOCOC; COCOCOCOCOCOC; COCOCOCOCOCOCOC; COCOCOCOCOCOCOCOC

Properties
Chemical formula	H_{3}CO(CH_{2}O)_{n}CH_{3}
Molar mass	Variable
- Except where otherwise noted, data are given for materials in their standard state (at 25 °C [77 °F], 100 kPa). Infobox references

Polyoxymethylene dimethyl ethers (PODE or DMMn) are a class of chemical compounds with the molecular formula H_{3}CO(CH_{2}O)_{n}CH_{3} where n is typically about 3 to 8.

PODE can be produced from methylal and formaldehyde or a formaldehyde equivalent such as paraformaldehyde or trioxane.

PODE is used as a diesel fuel additive and as a solvent.
