= Annular fluidized bed =

Device for fluidisation in chemical engineering

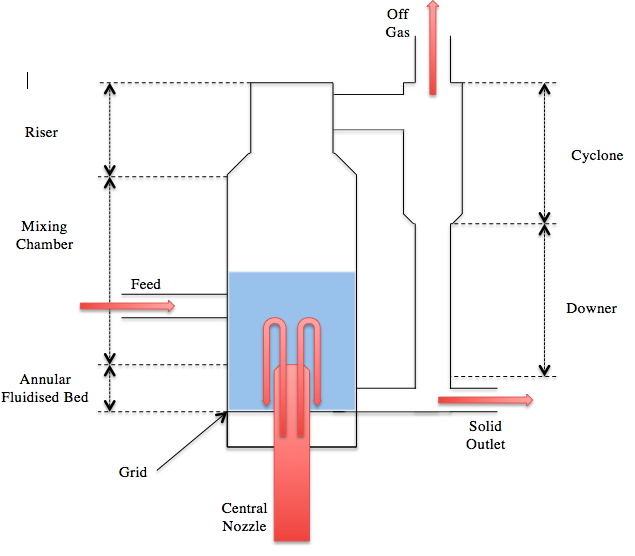
Section drawing of an annular fluidized bed

Fluidisation is a phenomenon whereby solid particulate is placed under certain conditions to cause it to behave like a fluid. A fluidized bed is a system conceived to facilitate the fluidisation. Fluidized beds have a wide range of applications including but not limited to: assisting with chemical reactions, heat transfer, mixing and drying. According to Collin et al. (2009), an annular fluidized bed consists of "a large central nozzle surrounded by a stationary fluidized bed".

== History ==
- Fritz Winkler created the first fluidised bed in 1922 for coal gasification.
- The next advancement in fludizied bed was the Circulating fluidised bed produced in 1942 for catalytic cracking of organic oils.
- Finally in the early 1990s annular fluidised beds was conceptualised and its current uses are:

- Waste heat boiler pilot plant (1992)
- Circored direct reduction plant (1996)
- Ore preheater, Australia (2002)
- Reducing ilmenite roaster, Mozambique (2005)

== Process characteristics ==
A general Annular Fluidized Bed (AFB) introduces gas at high speeds that enter the reactor from the bottom of the large central nozzle and additional fluidized gas is introduced through an annular nozzle ring. As a result, gas and solids are extensively mixed in the dense bottom part of the mixing chamber and flow upward in the riser. The gas and solids both leave the riser and are separated in a cyclone depending on the set velocities. The separated gas flows through a bag filter and the solids move downwards in the downer which is fed into the bottom of the plant which repeats the process again.

=== Main components ===
The bottom section of the riser is narrowed to avoid solids from accumulating in the bottom section. Instead of the riser walls being smooth it is generally composed of membrane waterwall surfaces, this added feature influences the solid flow patterns in the vicinity, hence influences mixing and gas-solid mixing. The riser exits are divided into two types; “once through exits” which involves the exits being smoothly curve or tapered. This exit allows a large net circulation and is optimal for short uniform residence time as well as quickly decaying catalysts. The other exit is “internal reflux exits” which is an abrupt exit causing a substantial amount of entrained solids being internally separated from the gas reaching the top of the reactor. The cyclone is an integral part of an annular fluidized bed, particular sized particles are separated by varying the velocity of feed gas. Consequently, at high velocity gas provides enough kinetic energy to separate particles from the fluidized bed. The feed gas and small particles fly into a cyclone separator and there the feed- gas and particles are separated. In turn, particles can be returned or removed to the bed depending on the size of the particle. The entrained solids are captured and sent back to the base of the riser through a vertical standpipe. The large central nozzle is the main component of the Annular Fluidized bed and this differentiate itself from other fluidized beds. The central nozzle is surrounded by a stationary fluidized bed and “due to moderate primary gas fluidisation of the annulus, the solids overflow at the upper edge of the central nozzle” which is then transported and mixed in the mixing chamber by a high upward velocity central secondary gas stream.

=== Flow regime ===
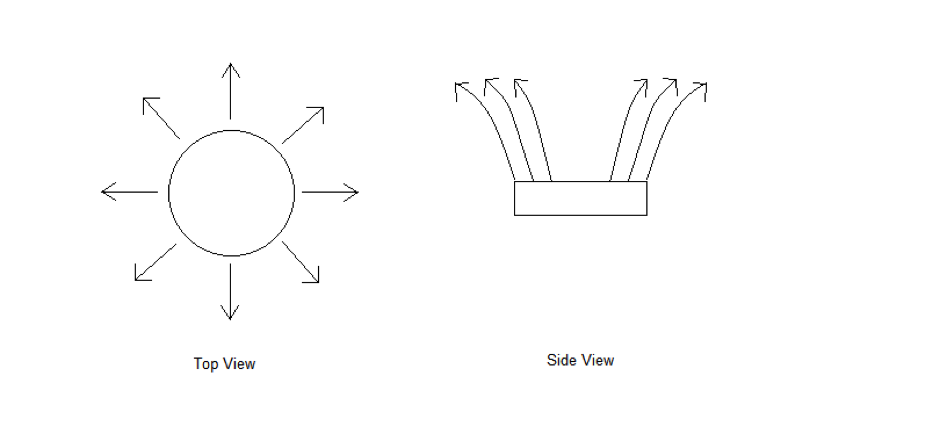
A top view and side view sketch of the motion of an Annular Fluidized Beds

The annular fluidized bed is a new type of fluidized bed that has a specific type of motion where it moves in radial. There is relatively little axial mixing of gases and there is radial motion. The axial flow profile of the annular fluidized bed can be determined by pressure drops along the plant height, which can be divided into three major parts: the annulus, the bottom and the top part of the mixing chamber. Based on the height of the bed, while the annulus has a porosity close to the solids minimal fluidization porosity, each region of bed is characterized by different pressure gradients. The closer to the central nozzle, the lower the pressure gradient and the higher the pressure drop in the mixing chamber. With known pressure gradient (ΔP/ΔH), the solid concentration can be calculated using Wirth equation shown below:

〖(1-ε)〗_∆P=∆P/∆H(ρ_s-ρ_f )g

According to an experiment characterization of the flow pattern in an annular fluidized bed carried out by Anne Collin, Karl-Ernst Wirth and Michael Stroder, at a height of 150mm above the central nozzle, the pressure gradient is approximately zero for small velocities and increases with increasing velocity.

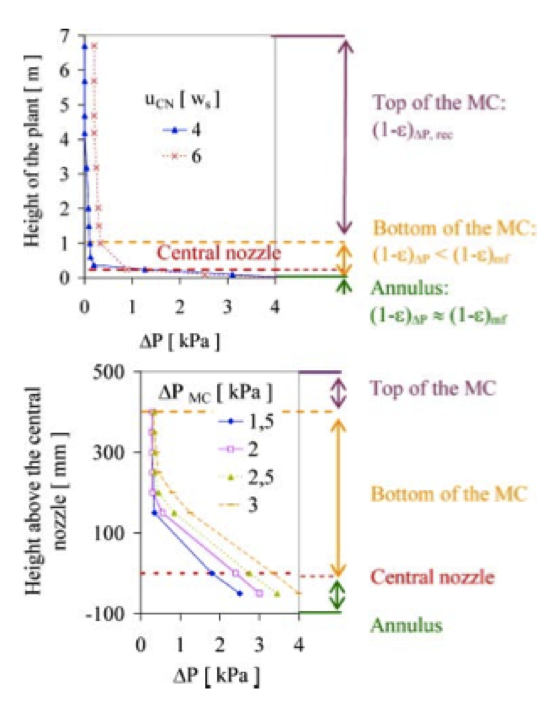
Height above the plant and above the central nozzle

Two distinct types of flow are shown in two different regions: “the flow pattern directly above the central nozzle shows a typical jet profile characterized by low solids concentrations around 8% and high upwards solids velocities (3 m/s) thus resulting in high local solids mass fluxes.” The surrounding of annular region at the bottom of the mixing chamber is on the other hand, the flow pattern is characterized by high solids concentration “with increasing values towards the wall e.g. 46% for the 100 mm probe height above the central nozzle” The solids velocities and mass fluxes are positive around the wall region where a descending is expected. However, the measured velocities may not be an accurate portrayal of the actual solids velocities in the region where high transversal and radial mixing are present. This is due to only vertical velocities being recorded by the capacitance probes. Hence, the calculated solids mass fluxes always have to be considered in the same direction. To summarize, the fully developed flow pattern in the annular fluidized bed shows a core-annulus structure, which is “characterized by the typical formation of a central jet surrounded by a region of high solids concentration at the bottom of the mixing chamber.” Varying the fluidization velocity in the annulus promotes more solids to be removed from bubbles and enables the convective mass flux to penetrate into the jet increase. The amount of solids that can be integrated into the jet at the end is determined by the gas velocity. Moreover, the ratio of the internal to the external solids circulation in the plant can be regulated due to the interaction of both mechanisms.

=== Height of 25 mm over the central nozzle ===
As gas velocity in the annulus depends on a calculated velocity of the solids ejected from bubbles, it is more difficult for the solids coming from the annulus with increasing velocity in the nozzle to penetrate into the central gas jet under a constant fluidization velocity. Increasing the central velocity at a height of 25 mm above the nozzle decreases the time-averaged solids concentration. However, an increase in this velocity has no effect on the solids concentration above the annulus. On the other hand, for a low central gas velocity, the solids velocities over the annulus and above the nozzle show nearly the same value with sharp velocity gradient.

=== Height of 200mm over the central nozzle ===
The flow pattern of a circulating fluidized bed is fully developed at the probe height of 200mm above the central nozzle. At this height, the typical concentration increases towards the wall and after combining with the falling solids velocity, this results in a negative solid mass flux. The shape of the solids concentration profile is independent on the gas velocity, however the absolute concentration is lower over the cross-section with integral solid concentrations. As a result, the solids mass flux has a slight decrease with increasing gas velocity in the central nozzle with integral values over the plant cross-section.

=== Influence of gas velocity in the annular fluidized bed ===
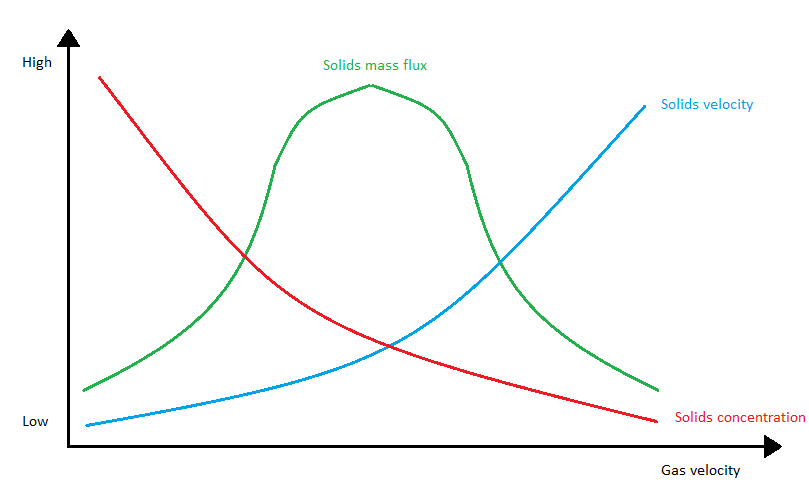
Influence of gas velocity in the Annular Fluidized Bed

Bubbling occurs in the annular fluidized bed caused by the introduction of gas by the central nozzle at a certain velocity moves in the general upwards direction. The sudden eruption of gas at the central nozzle causes particles to be transport in the bubbles wake By increasing the velocity of the annulus results in an increase in the bubble size and the bubbling velocity. The new increase in bubble dynamics enables “the ejected solids to penetrate deeper into the central gas jet”. As a result of this, the concentration and velocity of solids increases and consequently the solid optimum mass flux increases.

=== Design heuristics ===
- Cohesive particles and large particles greater than 1 mm does not fluidize well and usually are separated in other ways.
- Rough correlations have been made of minimum fluidization velocity, bed expansion, minimum bubbling velocity, bed level fluctuation and disengaging height. It is recommended by experts that any real design be based on pilot plant work.
- “Practical operations are conducted at two or more multiples of the minimum fluidizing velocity” .
- Products can be maximised by varying the fluidization velocity in the annulus, more solids can be ejected from the bubbles and the convective mass flux able to penetrate into the jet increases.

== Advantages and disadvantages ==
Due to the particular characteristics of AFB whereby gasses are introduced through the central nozzle at a high velocity, an intense mixing zone is achieved on the bed comparable to the conditions by an external loop of a Circulating fluidized bed. The AFB combines the advantages of long solid residence time and good heat and mass transfer, making it ideal for use heat exchanging processes such as cooling, heating or heat recovery and facilitating reactions. AFB can be combined with other fluidized bed types to assist with the process and further enhance its existing properties to increase productivity of a process.

The AFB characteristics are highly desirable in some applications however it can have an undesirable effect on other applications, which would require shorter residence times and a less intense mixing such as an ore roasters where particles would not be required to leave the fluidized bed. The cost of an AFB would also be higher compared to that of other fluidized beds as the introduction of the central nozzle complicates production of the components and introduces extra cost. An AFB would require more frequent maintenance and higher maintenance costs due to the extra and more complicated components. The central nozzle may easily clog due to unwanted particles entering the nozzle.

Though the AFB has potential to improve the efficiency of current processes, it is not without limitations. Due to the AFB being a recent advancement in fluidization technology, little systematic study has been done on this, and characterising global and local flow patterns may prove difficult for chemical engineers as the “bed hydrodynamics are not the same in small and large scale fluidized beds”. The implementation of this new technology into existing plants may prove difficult and costly; therefore there have been only a few advancement of the AFB since its conception. Few plants exists where AFB technology has been implemented however there may still be a few years before its full industrial applications will be realized and widely used.

== Applications ==
An annular fluidized bed (AFB) can have a wide range of applications due to its ability to be used in conjunction with other fluidized bed type. The AFB is ideal for applications that require a fast and efficient heat and mass transfer with intense mixing. These applications can range from dryers, heat exchangers, heaters, coolers and reactors.

=== Designs available and new developments ===
Though a relatively new technology, the use of AFB in the industry has slowly increased over the years. One such example is the company Outotec, who specialises in the field of fluidization technology. Outotec has integrated the use of AFB in its recent plants designs to further improve the process. Current existing plants by Outotec utilising AFB include:

- Waste heat boiler pilot plant, 1 tpd
- Circored direct reduction plant, CAL, Trinidad, 1,500 tpd
- Ore preheater, HIsmelt Corporation, Australia, 4,000 tpd
- Reducing ilmenite roaster, Kenmare Resources plc, Mozambique, 1,200 tpd

Note: Facts and figures obtained for Outetec The Circored, Circoheat and Circotherm processes devised by the company are some examples of applications for this fluidized bed technology.

- Circored- the process, developed in the 1990s for direct reduction of iron. “Circored process uses hydrogen as the only reductant to apply a two stage circulating fluidized bed/ bubbling fluidized bed reactor configuration for reduction. An AFB based flash heater is used to achieve the direct reduced iron briquetting temperature.”
- Circoheat- this process preheats iron ore fines to a temperature of 850 °C. The iron ore are introduced to a circulating fluidized bed where offgas from an Hlsmelt smelt reduction vessel is introduced to the reactor via an AFB. The offgas is then combusted with air to heat the ores.
- Circotherm- one of the latest development of Outotec, the core system of AFB is utilised for heat recovery and solids recovery via cyclone.

As seen from the Outotec examples, an annular fluidized bed can have a wide range of applications as any other fluidization technology. However, as it is a recent development in this field its full potential has yet to be realized and implemented for industrial applications

== Safety and environmental issues ==
=== Air purification ===
One application of an AFB is the purification of air. It begins by focusing the sun's ultraviolet light on particles of silica gel, which are coated with a fine layer of titanium dioxide catalyst. The uvlight then able to charge these particles. These positive and negative charged particles are then available to initiate various chemical reactions. When polluted air is passed through the central nozzle and into the fluidised bed, contaminants that contact the photo-catalytic particles are adsorbed onto the particle surface. The contaminants react with the positive and negative charges and are chemically broken down. The result is purified air.

=== Off-gas ===
Off-gas is the gaseous product exiting a cyclone separator that is connected to a fluidized bed. If the gas is clean and contaminate free it can be cooled via a condenser and then filtered to remove fine particles. Once filtered it may be directed back into the system or tapered off. In various cases volatile and/or poisonous gases may be used as feed gas for fluidised beds. The off gas produced from the operation may have a considerable amount of such gases and therefore need to be neutralised. Allowing the gases to escape into the environment may cause green house gases and are toxic to local flora and fauna. Cleaning off-gas increases sustainability and negates adverse effects to the environment.

=== Fine particulates ===
During the operation of a fluidised bed particles are transported by the kinetic energy provided by a feed gas. At certain velocities fine particles may fly into a cyclone and separated from the flue gas. These fine particles can either be returned to the system or removed. Once removed these particles depending on their nature may have adverse effects on the environment and must be treated carefully.

For example, in mining process currently in Mozambique, annular fluidised beds are used to preheat and reduce ilmenite ore, ilmenite is hazardous compound as crystalline silica is known to cause lung fibrosis and is a known carcinogen. Companies operating such equipment and detrimental substances must dispose of their waste properly.

== See also ==
- Cyclonic separation
- Fluidization
- Fluidized bed combustion
- Fluidized bed reactor
- Outotec
