= Fluidized bed (disambiguation) =

Articles on Fluidized bed include:

- Fluidized bed
- Fluidized bed combustion
- Fluidized bed dryer
- Fluidized bed reactor
- Coffee roasting using a fluidized bed
