= Lighty (surname) =

Lighty is a surname. Notable people with this surname include:

- Chris Lighty (1968–2012), American music industry executive
- Darren Lighty (born 1969), American hip-hop and R&B record producer and songwriter
- David Lighty (born 1988) American professional basketball player
- JoAnn Slama Lighty, American chemical engineer
- Scott Lighty (born 1978), American kickboxer and mixed martial artist
