= Flash reactor =

As an extension of the fluidized bed family of separation processes, the flash reactor (FR) (or transport reactor) employs turbulent fluid introduced at high velocities to encourage chemical reactions with feeds and subsequently achieve separation through the chemical conversion of desired substances to different phases and streams. A flash reactor consists of a main reaction chamber and an outlet for separated products to enter downstream processes.

FR vessels facilitate a low gas and solid retention (and hence reactant contact time) for industrial applications which give rise to a high throughput, pure product and less than ideal thermal distribution when compared to other fluidized bed reactors. Due to these properties as well as its relative simplicity FRs have the potential for use for pre-treatment and post-treatment processes where these strengths of the FR are prioritized the most.

Various designs of a FR (e.g. pipeline FR, centrifugal FR, vessel FR) exist and are currently used in pilot industrial plants for further development. These designs allow for a wide range of current and future applications, including water treatment sterilization, recovery and recycling of steel mill dust, pre-treatment and roasting of metals, chemical looping combustion as well as hydrogen production from biomass.

== Properties ==
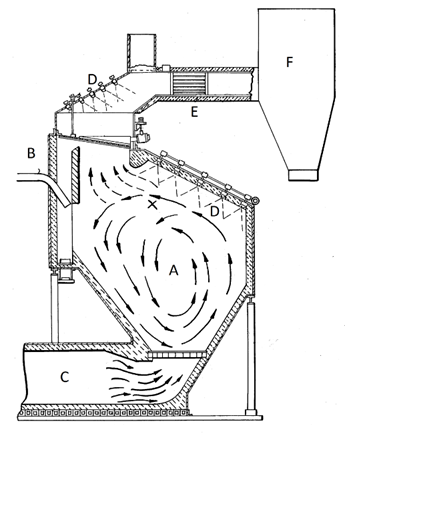
A figure of the inside of a flash reactor. Gas enters at C circulates inside A, is cooled down by D. Feed enters at B and exits at E and F

The vessel flash reactor is a design commonly used and is shown in the figure to the right. Gas is introduced from the bottom at an elevated temperature and high velocity, with a slight drop in velocity experienced at the central part of the vessel. Chamber A is designed to be "egg shaped", with a relatively narrow bottom cross sectional area and a wide upper cross sectional area. This configuration is designed to increase the fluid's velocity at the chamber's bottom, allowing for heavy feed particles to be in a continuous circulation that promotes a reaction site for separation processes.

The method of feed delivery varies depending on its phase. Solids may be delivered using a conveyor B, whilst fluids are vaporized and sprayed directly into the FR. It is then contacted with a continuously circulating hot gas that was introduced in section C. This continuously circulating gas interacts throughout the chamber with the incoming feed, with the surfaces of the particles generating insoluble salts as a result of reactions. Product mixture is then separated through E, where an exhaust vent emits gaseous products. Temperature of this stream is controlled by a coolant emitted by the vessel's spray nozzles D.

== Design characteristics and heuristics ==
Whilst a variety of applications are available for a flash reactor, they follow a general set of operating parameters/heuristics that are similar. The following lists the important parameters to consider when designing a FR:

=== Fluid velocity and flow configuration ===
A relatively fast fluid velocity (10–30 m/s) is usually required in FR operations to encourage a continuous particle distribution throughout the reactor's vessel. This minimizes the column's slip velocity (average velocity difference of different fluids in a pipe), providing a positive impact on heat and mass transfer rates and allowing for the use of smaller diameter vessels which can lower operating costs. Also, the use of a vertical fluid flow configuration will result in a lack of feed particle mixing in the horizontal and vertical direction, as such, discouraging particle interactions that would decrease product impurity.

=== Solid retention time ===
The use of a fast fluid velocity, as described above, also ensures a short solid feed retention time. This would cater for reactions that require a purer product and higher throughput. However, if the operating condition for a certain application requires an extended reaction time, this can be implemented by introducing a cyclical operation. By employing a backflow line, the fluid in the FR can be recirculated with the feed to allow for additional contact time.

=== Refractory lining material ===
Due to the high temperature requirements for FR operations, a refractory lining is required to reinforce and maintain vessel integrity over time. Also, a refractory lining serves to isolate the chamber's high temperature from ambient temperature. For example, in the Reco-Dust process, the FR is lined with two separate refractory materials: aluminum oxide bricks for the combustion chamber, and silicon carbide bricks for the conical outlet part. In addition, design of the vessel can vary in shapes and sizes (i.e. from pipeline to an egg-like shape) that aims to promote the vertical circulation of the gases and particulate matter.

=== Feed and fluid type ===
To minimize hold-up of material in the reactor, a dense gas with light solids are recommended for the operation of the FR. The solid feed fed into the reactor can only consist of heat-resistant materials and will be at best when a short retention time is only required. It is also desired to for a solid feed to be dry, pourable and with a well-defined grain size.

== Flash reactor types ==
=== Centrifugal flash reactor ===
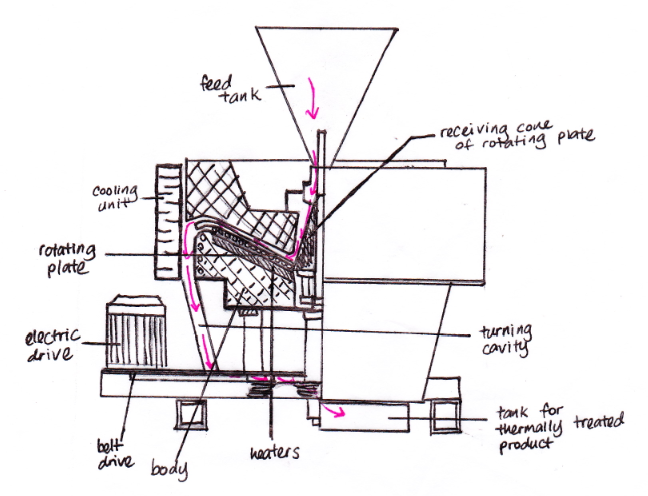
A basic description of a tseflar reactor (centrifugal flash reactor)

Unlike other FR designs, the powdered feed is contacted on a solid heat carrier rather than a gaseous carrier. It involves the use of a heated rotating plate that disperses the feed powder particles for a short duration. This is achieved by the use of centrifugal forces, where it compresses the powder onto the plate's surface, allowing for direct contact between the particles and hot metal, which enables a higher heat transfer rate. the figure on the right illustrates the TSE-FLAR set up, with the arrows illustrating the direction of the feed traveling from the feed tank, to the metering unit, to the rotating plate, and finally to the cooling water unit.

=== Pipeline flash reactor ===
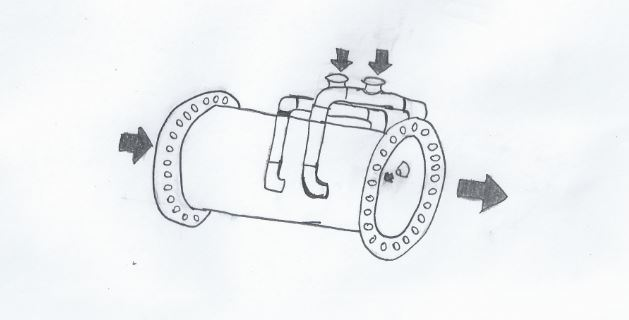
This picture shows the inlet and outlet flows of a pipeline flash reactor

A pipeline flash reactor (PFR) is a relatively new device developed through the principles of a FR thus possessing most of its characteristics, functions and properties. As inferred from its name, the shape of the pipeline reactor takes the form of a pipe. Even though it is a new derivative product of an older technology, it is being trialed in industrial size operations. Pipeline flash reactors are used as a tertiary or post treatment step in waste water treatment, either integrated in new plants or retrofitted in existing developments. The PFR's shape allows it to be easily integrated into new process systems and be retrofitted into older existing systems to improve the overall system's efficiency. Due to its shape, modifications and extensions can be easily added to the PFR to accommodate the requirements of certain processes.

In the PFR, the reactants come into contact with each other in the pipe rather than a mixing vessel in conventional mixing systems, such as a continuously stirred tank reactor. This eliminates the need for extra mixing tanks which saves space but as a trade-off, the actual reaction site will be dependent on the pipe specifications and velocity of the fluid. The PFR also eliminates the need of bulky cascade systems or tanks used by other technologies in existing developments which can reduce maintenance costs. Due to the nature of the device, the reactants processed in PFRs will have short retention times, however, adding backflows into the system is a technique which can increase retention time if required. Unlike conventional mixing systems, a turbulent mixing chamber can be realized without producing pressure drops. Also, PFRs, like most flash reactors, are highly efficient with a small footprint.

== Applications ==
The versatility of flash/transport reactors are suitable for a wide range of quality sensitive separation processes. The following describes the main applications for the flash reactor, note that most flash reactor applications do not require any post-treatment or pre-treatment systems due to a lack of waste generated.

=== Ozone injection for water treatment sterilization ===
The (PFR) is a growing technology with applications in improving the efficiency of certain processes such as the waste-water treatment. A pilot reactor was installed in California as part of the [Castaic Lake Water Agency] (CLWA) Expansion plan. The PFR serves as an auxiliary mixing and contact device to promote the ozone absorption in treated water. The PFR used customized nozzles to inject the ozone/water mixture at high velocities back into the bulk of the treated fluid. The use of PFRs, such as the reactor in the CLWA expansion, in water treatments is becoming more popular since the PFRs eliminates the need for additional tanks that would have been required for processes such as chlorination. Smaller basins are sufficient in providing the contact time between reactants for microbial inactivation thus reducing installation footprints in new developments. Also, the reactants will leave the PFRs quicker due to a shorter retention time; it was found that effective dispersion of the side stream into the bulk fluid was accomplished in as short as 1 second.

=== Treatment of steel mill dust to recover zinc ===
Since 2010, a flash-reactor pilot plant was successfully operating at the Montanuniversität in Leoben, Austria. Known as the RecoDust process, such a setup was designed to recover zinc from the dust collected in steel operations. Whilst tests have proven the functionality of this process, further research and implementation of this process in industry was halted due to the steel industry's uncertain economic outlook.

Nonetheless, research has shown a great potential for the use of the FR in recovering zinc from steel mill dust as it provides a strong oxidizing and reducing condition in the reaction vessel, with no waste materials produced. The large reaction surface area of the dust material input as well as not having an inner Zn-cycle and not requiring pretreatment processes has proven the effectiveness and efficiency of the RecoDust process.

A typical RecoDust process will often require temperatures from 1600-1650 °C with a dry, pourable, and well-defined grain sized raw material input of approximately 300 kg/h. In one experiment, 94% of chlorine, 93% of fluorine and 92% of lead was eliminated from the steel mill dust with a 97% recovery of zinc.

=== Rapid thermal treatment of powdered materials ===
The use of a rapid thermal heating process followed by their quenching/cooling is essential in many chemical engineering fields. For example, the aluminum hydroxide powder (i.e. gibbsite) used for the preparation of an alumina-based catalyst goes through the process of thermochemical activation (TCA) to form a thermally activated product, Al_{2}O_{3}∙nH_{2}O. A centrifugal FR, TSEFLAR can be employed to heat the powder up to 400-900 K with a plate temperature of 1000 K and a speed of 90-250 turns per minute. Such settings have shown to produce a product output of 40 dm^{3}/hr with a thermal treatment of less than 1.5 s.

=== Metallurgy ===
Flash reactors have enormous potential for replacing or assisting existing primary ore oxidation, reduction or other pre-treatment conditioning processes (e.g. calcining) in metal refinery. The simplicity and throughput of a flash reactor can provide a cost-effective solution to ease the use of existing, expensive rigorous processes.

==== Preheating ====
Preheating of crushed or fine ores can be carried out within a FR, utilising the short retention times to most quickly increase temperatures to reach conditions required in later processes. In iron and ilmenite ores high FR throughputs allows for substantial overall reduction in operating energy consumption, as well as provide a mixing site with other reactants such as hydrogen for briquetting in the main refining process.

==== Roasting ====
The oxidation of crushed particulate ores and the removal of sulfide, arsenic or other contaminants is a crucial separation process in the purification of metals which can be carried out within a FR. The oxidation of sulfide ores result in a conversion of small sized solid sulfide ore to oxides and residual sulfur dioxide gas culminating in a separation by converting unwanted sulfides into a gaseous phase. These contaminants can then go under post-treatment to create useful products from the waste stream, such as sulfuric acid using the contact process.

The equation below displays some examples of roasting oxidation reactions used in refining zinc from sphalerite and other ores.

2AS (s) + 3O_{2} (g) ⇌ 2MO(s) + 2SO_{2} (g)
where A=Cu, Zn, Pb

In ilmenite roasting to produce synthetic, the magnetic properties of the ore are changed at high temperatures as ferrite compounds within the ore are oxidized. This results in the separation of oxidised ferric compounds from paramagnetic chromite components within the ore at the reactor outlet where the product may be further refined to synthesize iron or rutile downstream. In roasting gold-bearing sulfide ores, sulfur or arsenic diffusion gradients encourage the migration of gold towards mineral pores. Hence, continual roasting and volatilisation of sulfur and arsenic allows for the coalescence of gold at the surface of mineral particles which can then be separated efficiently by downstream processes such as leaching.

In a FR, the high throughput implies a high particle concentration per unit volume of gas and hence a large contact area of reaction for mass transfer. Further, the tolerance for this reaction to short retention times make this process ideal for carrying out industrial roasting. This allows for lower-grade feed materials to be utilised to improve both product capacity as well as quality compared to conventional treatment. Hence, the simplicity of FR implementation and its high product output optimizes costs of the roasting pre-treatment.

== Advantages and limitations over competitive processes ==
Applications	Competitive process	Advantage over competitive process	Limitations
Metallurgy (Roasting, Preheating)	Circulating Fluidized Bed Reactor	Higher throughput as short retention times acceptable for this application; long circulation is not necessary. This allows for greater ore turnover per unit time.; Lower operation cost per unit feed as spends less contact time within reactor.; Simple to implement, general advantage of FR's compared to more complicated CFB's	Heat distribution is distorted and isothermal conditions are unable to be achieved due to lower slip velocities within FR. May hinder product quality compared to the continuous isothermal conversion possible in a CFB reactor.
Recovery of zinc from steel mill dust	The Waelz process- a rotary kiln specialized in recycling zinc	Does not require any pretreatment steps and is processed in the same condition as they exit the baghouse filters of the dusting unit.; Several specifications of the dust are required in the Waelz process, but the RecoDust process can process a range of dust specifications, including low zinc content dusts.; Lower operating costs for future industries due to it only requiring a single FR unit for recycling zinc.	The Waelz process is a more well known- recognized as the best available technique across the [European Union], whereas the RecoDust process is relatively new; Potentially higher capital costs due to the new process and equipment
Water sterilization	Post treatment cascading systems and technologies that need basins: such as chlorination or UV disinfection of waste water	Less area needed in new developments; Shorter retention time than competitive processes; Flexible in implementation: adaptable to new processor retrofitted into existing systems; Design is adjustable for certain process requirements	Relatively new technology; Needs more pilot tests to gather sufficient data; Process cannot handle large concentrations of solids; Higher capital costs than competitive processes
Thermal chemical activation using TSEFLAR	Contact between particles with hot exhaust gas or hot granules of support/catalyst	Compact, versatile and simple design; Higher rate of heating - FR results in lower energy consumption and a more efficient process; Shorter retention time leads to formation of a purer activated product; Products are reproducible and stable; Due to the lack of hot exhaust, the process will not produce fuel combustion products which results in a more environmentally friendly process	TSEFLAR is more expensive and not as commercially available as the other processes due it being relatively new

== Future developments ==
=== Chemical looping combustion ===
Chemical Looping Combustion or CLC is a method where using a combination of CFB and Flash reactors to remove nitrogen and impurities from the air before the oxidation of the fuel using an oxidation and reduction cycle of a metal such as nickel. In CLC, hot air is injected into a metal which acts as a catalyst and an oxygen carrier such as Fe_{2}O_{3} or metallic nickel or copper. A flash reactor is used in the air injection process in the beginning of the loop. The use of flash reactors in this scenario allows the use of lower-grade feed materials and a substantial increase in capacity as well as product purity compared to conventional processing.

CLC can theoretically also be used to recover hydrogen from biomass during syngas synthesis and is explained in hydrogen production below.

=== Hydrogen production from biomass ===
Hydrogen production is an emerging technology in the field of renewable energy. As hydrogen demand is expected to grow exponentially, in the chemical, hydrocarbon, semiconductor industry, new sources for hydrogen must be found. Flash reactors in tandem with steam methane reforming and gasification, uses waste biomass such as a mixture of cellulose, lignin and other plant material organics to produce hydrogen gas. Most commonly used biomass waste is oil palm waste as a result of the palm oil industry.

Flash reactors can also be used in the drying section to quickly remove water content from the biomass by injecting high velocity heated air which acts as a pretreatment to the actual pyrolysis reaction which also occurs in a flash reactor. also shows that a flash reactor is used, after the grinding of the biomass, with the addition of extreme heat, into a mixture of bio-oil, char and ash. The ash and char produced from this reaction is later removed due to their catalytic properties which would interfere with the steam reformation.
