= Vibratory fluidized bed =

Vibratory Fluidized Bed (VFB) is a type of fluidized bed where the mechanical vibration enhances the performance of fluidization process. Since the first discovery of vibratory fluidized bed, its vibration properties proves to be more efficient in dealing with fine particles which appears to be very difficult to achieve with normal fluidized bed. Even though numerous publications and its popularity in industrial applications, the knowledge about vibratory dynamics and properties are very limited. Future research and development are needed to further improve this technology to bring it to another level.

== Introduction ==
Vibratory fluidized bed technology has been around since its first discovery in 1984 by Geldart, where he conducted an experiment to observe the behaviour of different types of particle groups behave when vibration mechanism are introduced to further fluidized the particles. Although it has been around for the past 20 years, only a few research has been done to further improve this technology. Recently, the world is focusing on environmental friendly machinery for the sustainability of the earth. Therefore, more research has been conducted to study the effect of vibration in fluidisation because not only vibratory fluidized bed is environmental friendly, it is also cheaper compare to other fluidized bed.

== Basic fundamental ==
Improvement over conventional fluidized bed technology has led to discovery of vibratory fluidized bed where the bed is design by combining vibration and gas flowing vertically towards the conveyor bed. It offers some advantages of fluidized bed, however the feed will move along the vibrating conveyor until they have dried adequately to break up and this will cause lower chance of agglomerates build-up in the feed; hence it is useful for processing group C particles which have small size of fine particles, into smaller agglomerates.

== Range of application ==
Vibratory fluidized beds are mainly used in several industries such as pharmaceutical, agricultural, catalyst, plastics, minerals, food processes. Typical applications for vibratory fluidized beds are drying products in the form of grains and crystals, cooling the dried products, agglomeration and granulation of coarse particles, and sterilising.

== Design available ==
As mention above vibratory fluidized bed are mainly used in numerous industries where certain particle size are needed to be consistent without any defect to produce better product for their consumer. Most common process operations used in vibratory fluidized bed technology are dryers and coolers.

=== Vibratory fluidized dryers ===
Standard type of vibratory fluidized dryer consist of vibrating tray conveyor where hot gases from the chamber will flow through the holes within the tray and come in contact with the materials to be dried. The tray area is big enough to tolerate constant flow of material through the bed and passed along the deck with a low depth on the tray. The vibrations to the deck are directed in vertical component to assist in fluidization of the material whereas the horizontal component of the vibration, support in transporting materials along the tray.

=== Vibratory fluidized cooler ===
Vibratory fluidized coolers operate in the same manner but instead of hot gases being feed from the chamber, it have recirculating air flowing through the chamber and equipped with atomizing nozzle to generate water mist as cooling medium. Other alternate designs include the use of cold water coils with the inlet air passing over them and this option are used when the incoming air have a large temperature difference compare to the material being cooled.

== Advantages and limitations of vibratory fluidized bed ==
Some of the advantages of vibratory fluidized beds include:

- Continuous drying throughout the unit.
- Handle products with a wide range of particle size and shape.
- Minimal fluidization velocity and pressure drop due to the vibration energy being transferred along the bed.
- Increase efficiency of gas to solid contact.
- Mechanical vibration enhances homogeneity and stability of fluidized bed layers.
- Easier to control the residence time distribution of processed material by manipulating the intensity of amplitude and frequency of vibration.

Limitations of vibratory fluidized bed are as follow:

- The inlet air temperature to the dryer process is limited.
- Climate condition can affect the unit's thermal efficiency.
- Build-up of local expansion region lead to unstable behaviour to the bed structure.

== Main process characteristics ==
To give a more detail insight into the vibrating fluidized bed, several characteristics have been stated below to show the relationship amongst the characteristics as well as the operating conditions to how they could possibly affect some process conducted using a vibrating fluidized bed.

=== Voidage behaviour on particle size ===
The term voidage refers to the spacing between the materials. It is critical to know how the voidage behaviour of certain particle sizes affects the process in a vibrating fluidized bed as they are one of the key factors to be considered when designing and scaling up the vibrating fluidized bed from lab scale to industrial scale. From several experiments conducted, it was shown that vibration helps in the fluidization of particles as the axial and radial voidage distribution become more homogeneous. This is especially true for vibrating fluidized beds with large vibration amplitudes. It was also found that with increasing bed height, the layers of particles in the bed could be damped out by the vibration energy. Analysis of the wave propagation showed that its parameters are affected by the fluidization behaviour.

=== Energy transfer ===
In a vibrating fluidized bed, energy is transferred when the vibrating wall comes into contact with the particles. These particles collide with other particles in the bed which passes kinetic energy in the form of wave propagation throughout the vibrating fluidized bed. The magnitude of the energy transferred is relative to the amplitude. This is because of the oscillations caused by the wave reflection of the medium boundary in the vibrating fluidized bed.

=== Bubbling behaviour ===
To assess the bubbling behaviour of the vibrating fluidized bed, factors such as the size of the bubble and its velocity were also taken into account. For various vibration amplitudes and frequencies, numerical simulations of the vibrating fluidized bed was conducted to better understand the behaviour of the bubbles under the vibrating conditions. The results showed that due to the oscillatory displacement of the vibrating fluidized bed causes the mean bubble diameter to increase but lowers the acceleration rate of the bubbles. Thus, it was concluded that bubbling behaviour in a vibrating fluidized bed is dependent on the vibrations.

=== Multicomponent moisture ===
To consider multicomponent moisture solid in a vibrating fluidized bed drier, a model was used to assess the characteristics of drying a thin layer of particle which was wetted with a multicomponent mixture. This was done to gain a better understanding of the complex treatment of multicomponent drying which is tedious and time-consuming process. Based on the model using a plug flow of solids, the selectivity and best drying conditions to achieve the ideal final moisture composition were determined. For a component mixture which is highly volatile, the composition of the liquid which was left in the product from the vibrating fluidized bed can be controlled using small amount of the other components to the solid feed.

=== Pressure drop ===
Knowing that one of the advantages of the vibrating fluidized bed is its small pressure drop, several studies has been made to show that for a given operating condition range, the pressure drop of the vibrating bed when compared to a conventional one is much smaller. This is also the case when comparing the minimum fluidization pressure drop as the vibration decreases due to the increase in amplitude and decrease in frequency. The presence of this pressure drop across the vibrating fluidized bed has a large impact on the heat and mass transfer in the process. There is an increase in bed porosity which corresponds to the pressure loss reduction. This change in pressure loss is dependent on the frequency and amplitude of the vibration of the surface.

=== Effects of Bed Height ===
The height of the bed for a vibrating fluidized bed is also an important characteristic as it affects a few other parameters as well. From previous research, it was found that for a vibrating fluidized bed, the minimum fluidization velocity is affected by bed height. Apart from that, changes in the height of the bed for a vibrating fluidized bed also affects fluidization behaviour and flow dynamics as well. By increasing the static bed height, there was an increase in solid concentration in the centre part of the vibrating fluidized bed.

== Heuristics to be used during design of the process ==
When first designing the vibrating fluidized bed, certain heuristics were followed so that the designs of the vibrating fluidized bed could be best suited for the desired process as well as knowing the optimal operating conditions to be used. Some of the heuristics are:

=== Motivation from previous process ===
After the first few fluidized beds were successfully applied into industrial processes, demand for more types of fluidization technology has rose to satisfy the growing industrial demand. The addition of vibratory mechanism to the fluidized bed in 1984 where Geldart showed that using mechanical vibrating sieve can improve the performance of fluidising small size of fine particles. These experiments are difficult to process these powders by fluidisation due to the unpredictable behaviours of particles. It was later found that it would be cheaper and more environmentally friendly by adding vibration into the fluidization process. This was then used as a starting point by many others for further fluidization research based on the effects of vibrations. Mujumdar (1988) devised two methods using vibration technic of fluidization for fluidizing hot-sensitive and paste-like materials. Yoshihide et al. (2003) studied the effect of vibration on fluidisation behavior and prediction of minimum fluidisation velocity. Kaliyaperumal et al. (2011) determined the effect of different vibration to the nano and sub-micro particles, those particles are hard to fluidise in the absence of mechanical vibration and have special properties.

=== Process Modelling ===
As mentioned before, one way to determine the best operating conditions would be creating a mathematical model or process model using software to simulate the vibrating fluidized bed for the desired process. The effects of gas velocity and temperature were modelled. One optimal operating condition would be increasing the drying rate. This is because with increased drying rate, the drying process in the vibrating fluidized bed will be shorter giving the vibrating fluidized bed an overall better efficiency. There are 3 major mechanisms which determine the drying rate. The mechanisms are the heat & mass transfer in the gas side, the thermodynamic equilibrium in between the two phases during contact and the heat & mass transfer within the wet solid. These three mechanisms will increase with the increase in gas velocity as well as the heat & mass transfer coefficient. This will then cause the drying rate to increase because of the increase in gas temperature which causes the gas humidity to decrease. The effects of particle size were modelled as well. It was found that. Larger particle need longer time to dry to reach the same moisture content due to increase in resistance within the particles against heat and mass transfer. Since the resistance against heat transfer within the particle is lower than the resistance against mass transfer; the convection heat not used to vaporize water is used to elevate the material temperature which will lead to higher moisture transfer coefficients within the particles and will cause higher drying rate. Therefore, it was concluded that for optimum operating conditions to be achieved, the particles which are fed into the vibratory fluidized bed should be decreased. Usually the particle size of the feed material is not a controlled parameter unless methods such as grinding are used but doing so would involve extra operating cost which should be avoided. Hence, another option would be by increasing the intensity of the vibrations in the vibrating fluidized bed.

=== Scaling-up ===
One of the final parts of the heuristics would be the scaling-up of the vibrating fluidized bed from laboratory scale to industrial scale. There are some factors which should be taken into consideration when proceeding with the scaling-up. One would be the energy consumption of an industrial scale vibrating fluidized bed. This is because a potential customer would want to know the requirements of the process. Therefore, individual energy consumption for each part of the vibrating fluidized bed should be taken into account. The same can be said about the vibrating fluidized bed when we look at it from an economical perspective. Most buyers of the vibrating fluidized bed would most likely use it for a process to achieve an income profit. Hence, a detail cost analysis should be done,. From an environmental point of view, there is not much to be worried off except for possible safety issues, because the vibrating fluidized bed itself is generally considered to be environmentally friendly because the waste produced are already treated in the process. Lastly, not forgetting the characteristics which may cause an effect when scaling-up such as voidage behaviour on particle size as mentioned earlier.

== Production of waste stream ==
For vibratory fluidized bed, the common waste products include ash, dust and small solid particles produced by materials contacting / heating. The inlet gas and overflow from a fluidized bed usually has to be cleaned due to environmental issues. The waste stream also contains large amount of product we interested in and need to be recovered. This process could be achieved by simple separation techniques such as gas cyclones, bag house and scrubbers.

=== Gas cyclones ===
Gas cyclone is a device to separate small solid particles from suspension in a gas. By feeding gas tangentially into the cyclone body, high speed rotating flow established a centrifugal force and creates vortexes of particles. Different cyclones have different specification and characteristics. Generally, larger than 100 μm or denser particles, which have more inertia, are pushed towards the wall and sink to the bottom of the cyclone, exit via the underflow. This part of solid will be collected as product of fluidized bed. If process required, multiple cyclones can operated in parallel to increase efficiency or in series to increase recovery. Overflow contains gas and small amount of ash and dust, it usually be deposited into the air or feed into a Bag house for further treatment.

=== Baghouse ===
A baghouse is an air pollution control device designed to filtrate out particles from air or another gas by using engineered fabric filter tubes. Different baghouse cleaning methods can applied to different applications. The general principle is to use heat or pressure to pulse air through top of the fabric filter material to detach the collected particles from the bags. "Fines" particles such as ash and dust will be filtrated out and collected into a fines discharge box. Alternatively, the fines can be reintroduced into the original product stream with a "blow-through" type rotary valve. The cleaned gas will be deposited into atmosphere by industrial exhaust fan and stack.

=== Scrubbers ===
A scrubber is also an air pollution control device. Compared to baghouse, a scrubber injects a dry reagent or slurry into dirty feed gas, via the contact of target materials to remove pollution. Depending on the properties of the compound, different pollutants correspond to different scrubbing techniques and reagents. For ash and dust, water can be used as a scrubbing solution.

== See also ==
- Fluidization
- Fluidized bed
