= JoAnn Slama Lighty =

American chemical engineer

- Education: University of Utah
- Scientific career
- Workplaces: University of Utah; Boise State University
- Thesis: Fundamentals of thermal treatment for the cleanup of contaminated solid wastes (1989)

JoAnn Slama Lighty is an American chemical engineer who is a professor at Boise State University. Her research considers carbon capture, chemical looping and black carbon emissions. In 2020 she was elected a Fellow of the American Association for the Advancement of Science for her air quality research.

== Education ==
Lighty was an undergraduate student at the University of Utah, where she specialized in chemical engineering. She remained there for her doctoral research, studying opportunities to cleanup contaminated waste using thermal treatment.

== Research and career ==
Lighty studies the combustion and gasifaction of fuels, and how these processes result in the formation of airborne pollutants. She has worked on carbon-capture from coal powered combustion systems and soot oxidation in fuel-lean conditions.

Lighty joined the faculty at the University of Utah in 1988. In 2007, Lighty was elected Chair of Chemical Engineering at the University. She spent 2010 as a Fellow at Churchill College, Cambridge. Her scientific research involves policy work with the United States Environmental Protection Agency and National Science Foundation.

Lighty worked as division director for chemical, bioengineering, environmental, and transport systems at the National Science Foundation. In this capacity, she oversaw the clean water program, which sought to identify low cost, low energy technologies to test and treat water. In 2017 Lighty joined Boise State University as dean of engineering.

=== Academic service ===
At the University of Utah, Lighty founded the High School Girls Engineering Abilities Realized (HiGEAR) outreach programme and the elementary engineering group.

== Awards and honors ==
- Society of Women Engineers Distinguished Engineering Educator Award
- Utah Engineering Educator of the Year
- YWCA Outstanding Achievement Award
- University of Utah Linda Amos Award for Distinguished Service to Women
- Fellow of the American Institute of Chemical Engineers
- Fellow of the American Association for the Advancement of Science
- American Institute of Chemical Engineers Lawrence K. Cecil Award

== Selected publications ==
- Lighty, JoAnn Slama; Veranth, John M.; Sarofim, Adel F. (2000-09-01). "Combustion Aerosols: Factors Governing Their Size and Composition and Implications to Human Health". Journal of the Air & Waste Management Association. 50 (9): 1565–1618. doi:10.1080/10473289.2000.10464197. ISSN 1096-2247. PMID 11055157. S2CID 44503309.
- Zielinska, B.; Sagebiel, J.; Arnott, W. P.; Rogers, C. F.; Kelly, K. E.; Wagner, D. A.; Lighty, J. S.; Sarofim, A. F.; Palmer, G. (May 2004). "Phase and Size Distribution of Polycyclic Aromatic Hydrocarbons in Diesel and Gasoline Vehicle Emissions". Environmental Science & Technology. 38 (9): 2557–2567. Bibcode:2004EnST...38.2557Z. doi:10.1021/es030518d. ISSN 0013-936X. PMID 15180051.
- Eyring, E. M.; Konya, G.; Lighty, J. S.; Sahir, A. H.; Sarofim, A. F.; Whitty, K. (2011-03-01). "Chemical Looping with Copper Oxide as Carrier and Coal as Fuel". Oil & Gas Science and Technology – Revue d'IFP Energies nouvelles. 66 (2): 209–221. doi:10.2516/ogst/2010028. ISSN 1294-4475.

== Personal life ==
Lighty is married with two daughters.
