= Thermal oxidizer =

Process unit to control air pollution

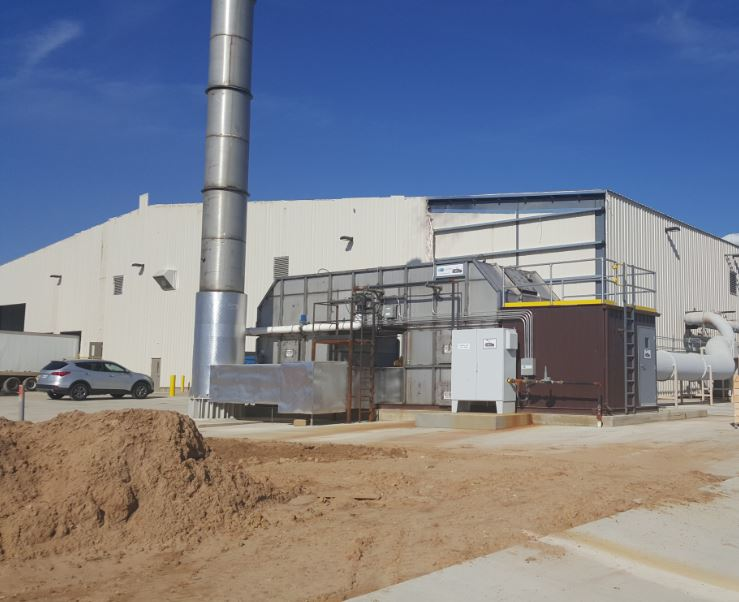
Thermal oxidizer installed at a factory.

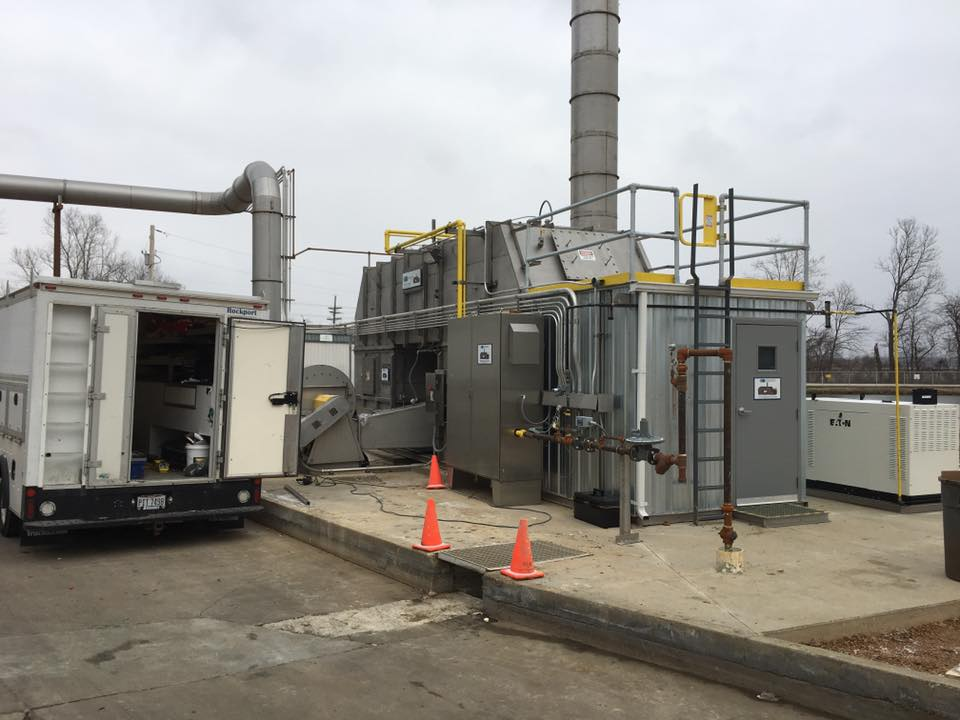
Preassembled process unit for air pollution control, i.e., a thermal oxidizer, being installed at a work site.

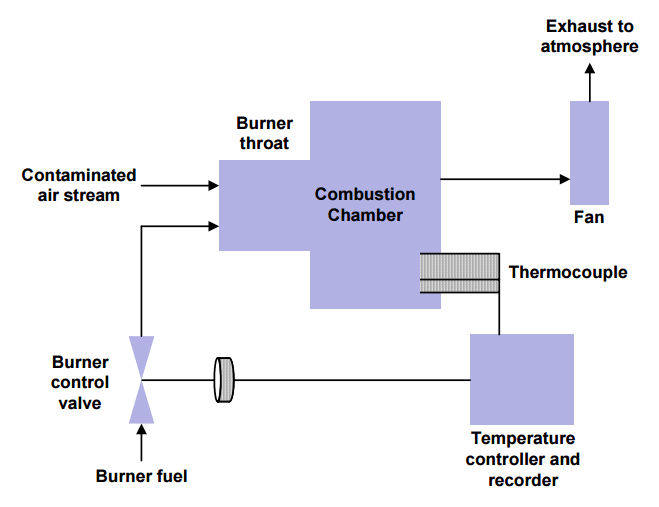
Schematic of a basic thermal oxidizer

A thermal oxidizer (also known as thermal oxidiser, or thermal incinerator) is a process unit for air pollution control in many chemical plants that decomposes hazardous gases at a high temperature and releases them into the atmosphere.

== Principle ==
Thermal oxidizers are typically used to destroy hazardous air pollutants (HAPs) and volatile organic compounds (VOCs) from industrial air streams. These pollutants are generally hydrocarbon based and when destroyed, via thermal combustion, they are chemically oxidized to form CO_{2} and H_{2}O. Three main factors in designing the effective thermal oxidizers are temperature, residence time, and turbulence. These systems typically operate at temperatures between 1,400 °F and 1,800 °F to ensure complete oxidation of volatile organic compounds. The temperature needs to be high enough to ignite the waste gas. Most organic compounds ignite at the temperature between 590 °C (1,094 °F) and 650 °C (1,202 °F). To ensure near destruction of hazardous gases, most basic oxidizers are operated at much higher temperature levels. When catalyst is used, the operating temperature range may be lower. Residence time is to ensure that there is enough time for the combustion reaction to occur. The turbulence factor is the mixture of combustion air with the hazardous gases.

== Technologies ==
=== Direct fired thermal oxidizer – afterburner ===
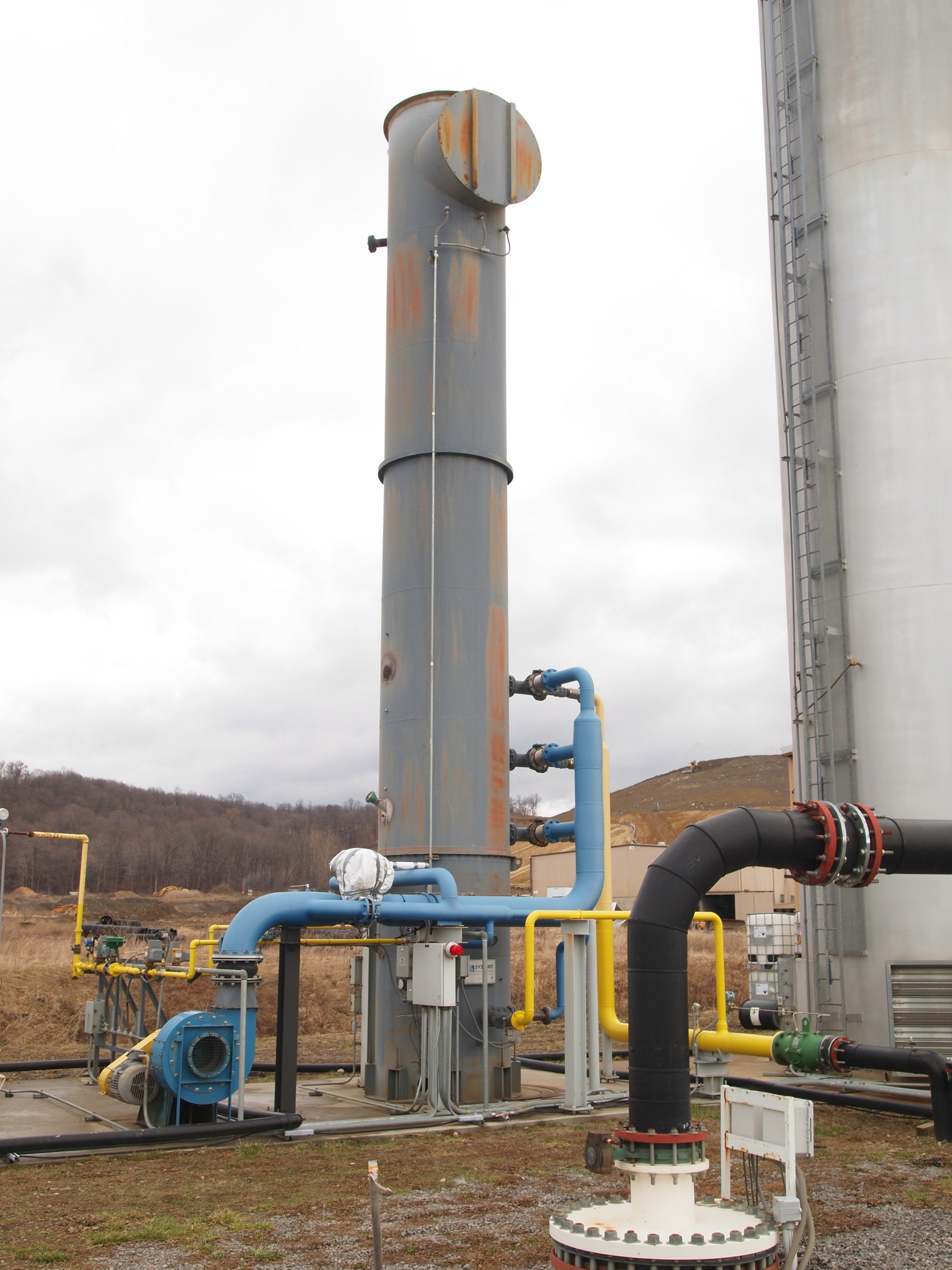
Direct-fired thermal oxidizer using landfill gas as fuel

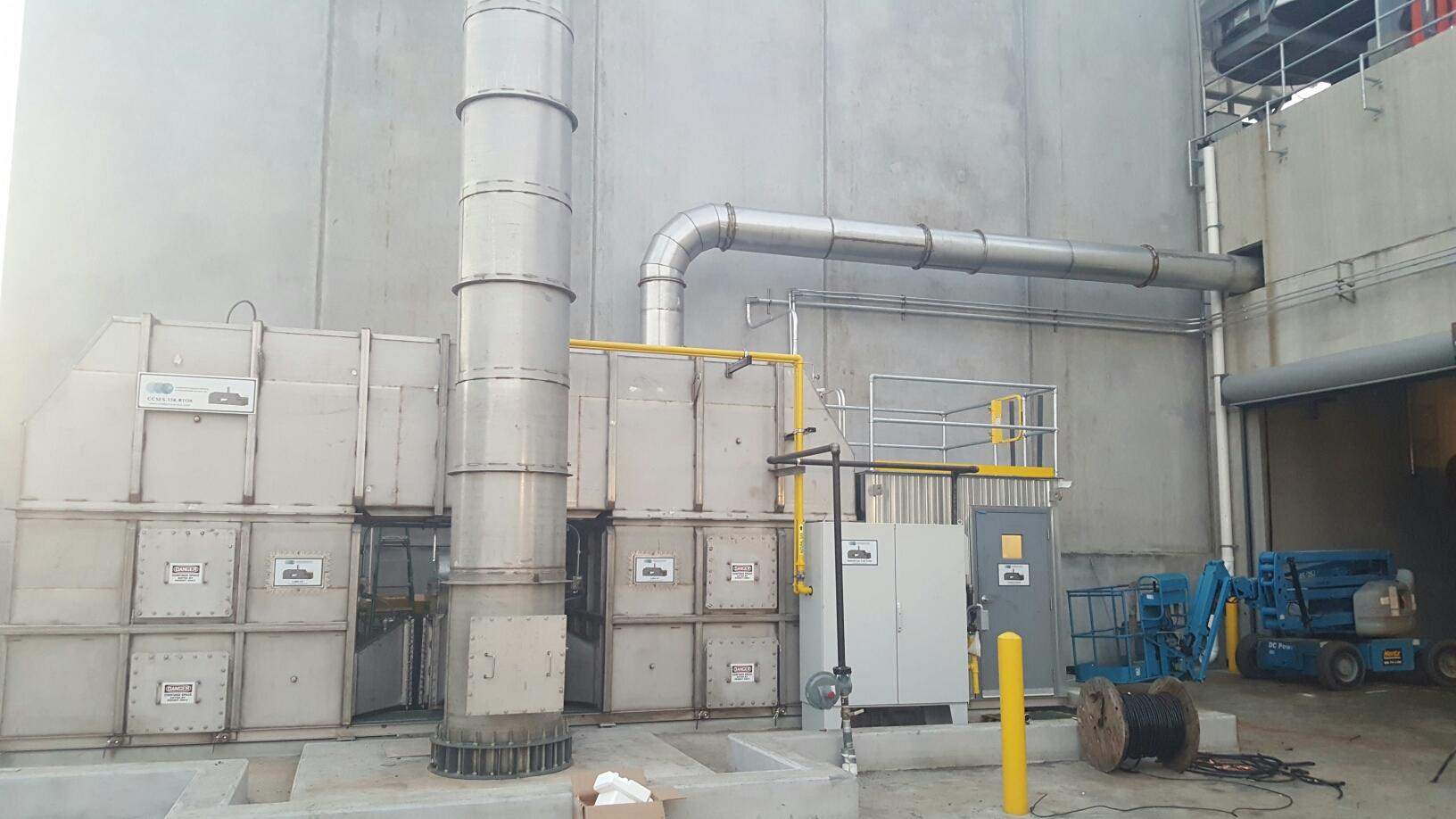
Regenerative thermal oxidizer (RTO) sized for 17,000 standard cubic feet per minute (SCFM).

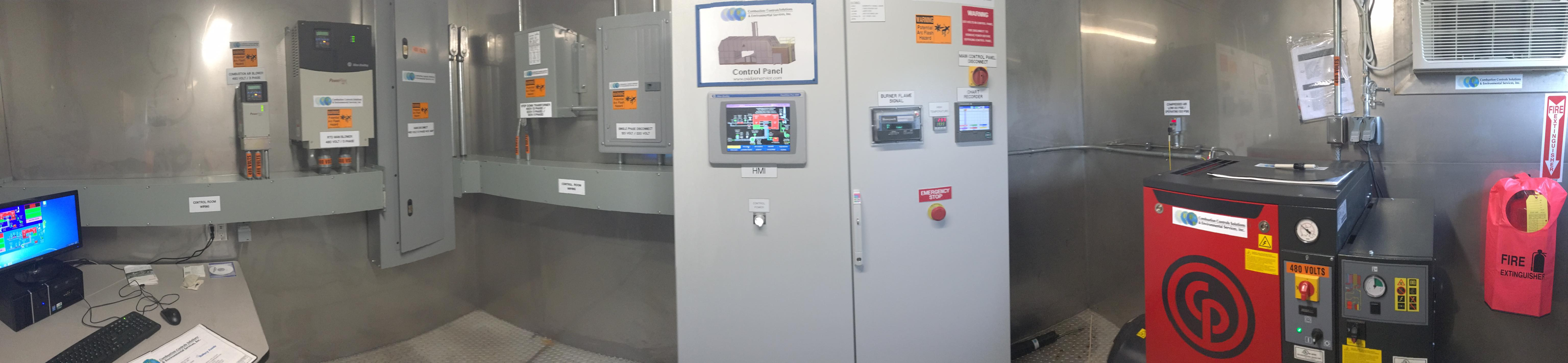
Control center with a programmable logic controller for a RTO.

The simplest technology of thermal oxidation is direct-fired thermal oxidizer. A process stream with hazardous gases is introduced into a firing box through or near the burner and enough residence time is provided to get the desired destruction removal efficiency (DRE) of the VOCs. Most direct-fired thermal oxidizers operate at temperature levels between 980 °C (1,800 °F) and 1,200 °C (2,190 °F) with air flow rates of 0.24 to 24 standard cubic meters per second.

Also called afterburners in the cases where the input gases come from a process where combustion is incomplete, these systems are the least capital intensive, and can be integrated with downstream boilers and heat exchangers to optimize fuel efficiency. Thermal Oxidizers are best applied where there is a very high concentration of VOCs to act as the fuel source (instead of natural gas or oil) for complete combustion at the targeted operating temperature.

=== Regenerative thermal oxidizer (RTO) ===
One of today's most widely accepted air pollution control technologies across industry is a regenerative thermal oxidizer, commonly referred to as a RTO. RTOs use a ceramic bed which is heated from a previous oxidation cycle to preheat the input gases to partially oxidize them. The preheated gases enter a combustion chamber that is heated by an external fuel source to reach the target oxidation temperature which is in the range between 760 °C (1,400 °F) and 820 °C (1,510 °F). The final temperature may be as high as 1,100 °C (2,010 °F) for applications that require maximum destruction. The air flow rates are 2.4 to 240 standard cubic meters per second.

RTOs are very versatile and extremely efficient – thermal efficiency can reach 95%. They are regularly used for abating solvent fumes, odours, etc. from a wide range of industries. Regenerative Thermal Oxidizers are ideal in a range of low to high VOC concentrations up to 10 g/m^{3} solvent. There are currently many types of Regenerative Thermal Oxidizers on the market with the capability of 99.5+% Volatile Organic Compound (VOC) oxidization or destruction efficiency. The ceramic heat exchanger(s) in the towers can be designed for thermal efficiencies as high as 97+%.

=== Ventilation air methane thermal oxidizer (VAMTOX) ===
Ventilation air methane thermal oxidizers are used to destroy methane in the exhaust air of underground coal mine shafts. Methane is a greenhouse gas and, when oxidized via thermal combustion, is chemically altered to form CO_{2} and H_{2}O. CO_{2} is 25 times less potent than methane when emitted into the atmosphere with regards to global warming. Concentrations of methane in mine ventilation exhaust air of coal and trona mines are very dilute; typically below 1% and often below 0.5%. VAMTOX units have a system of valves and dampers that direct the air flow across one or more ceramic filled bed(s). On start-up, the system preheats by raising the temperature of the heat exchanging ceramic material in the bed(s) at or above the auto-oxidation temperature of methane 1,000 °C (1,830 °F), at which time the preheating system is turned off and mine exhaust air is introduced. Then the methane-filled air reaches the preheated bed(s), releasing the heat from combustion. This heat is then transferred back to the bed(s), thereby maintaining the temperature at or above what is necessary to support auto-thermal operation.

=== Thermal recuperative oxidizer ===
A less commonly used thermal oxidizer technology is a thermal recuperative oxidizer. Thermal recuperative oxidizers have a primary and/or secondary heat exchanger within the system. A primary heat exchanger preheats the incoming dirty air by recuperating heat from the exiting clean air. This is done by a shell and tube heat exchanger or a plate heat exchanger. As the incoming air passes on one side of the metal tube or plate, hot clean air from the combustion chamber passes on the other side of the tube or plate and heat is transferred to the incoming air through the process of conduction using the metal as the medium of heat transfer. In a secondary heat exchanger the same concept applies for heat transfer, but the air being heated by the outgoing clean process stream is being returned to another part of the plant – perhaps back to the process.

=== Biomass fired thermal oxidizer ===
Biomass, such as wood chips, can be used as the fuel for a thermal oxidizer. The biomass is then gasified and the stream with hazardous gases is mixed with the biomass gas in a firing box. Sufficient turbulence, retention time, oxygen content and temperature will ensure destruction of the VOC's. Such biomass fired thermal oxidizer has been installed at Warwick Mills, New Hampshire. The inlet concentrations are between 3000–10.000 ppm VOC. The outlet concentration of VOC are below 3 ppm, thus having a VOC destruction efficiency of 99.8–99.9%.

=== Flameless thermal oxidizer (FTO) ===
In a flameless thermal oxidizer system waste gas, ambient air, and auxiliary fuel are premixed prior to passing the combined gaseous mixture through a preheated inert ceramic media bed. Through the transfer of heat from the ceramic media to the gaseous mixture the organic compounds in the gas are oxidized to innocuous byproducts, i.e., carbon dioxide (CO_{2}) and water vapor (H_{2}O) while also releasing heat into the ceramic media bed.

The gas mixture temperature is kept below the lower flammability limit based on the percentages of each organic species present. Flameless thermal oxidizers are designed to operate safely and reliably below the composite LFL while maintaining a constant operating temperature. Waste gas streams experience multiple seconds of residence time at high temperatures leading to measured destruction removal efficiencies that exceed 99.9999%. Premixing all of the gases prior to treatment eliminates localized high temperatures which leads to thermal NOx typically below 2 ppmV. Flameless thermal oxidizer technology was originally developed at the U.S. Department of Energy to more efficiently convert energy in burners, process heaters, and other thermal systems.

=== Fluidized bed concentrator (FBC) ===
In a Fluidized bed concentrator (FBC), a bed of activated carbon beads to adsorb volatile organic compounds (VOCs) from the exhaust gas. Evolving from the previous fixed-bed and carbon rotor concentrators, the FBC system forces the VOC-laden air through several perforated steel trays, increasing the velocity of the air and allowing the sub-millimeter carbon beads to fluidize, or behave as if suspended in a liquid. This increases the surface area of the carbon-gas interaction, making it more effective at capturing VOCs.

== Catalytic oxidizer ==
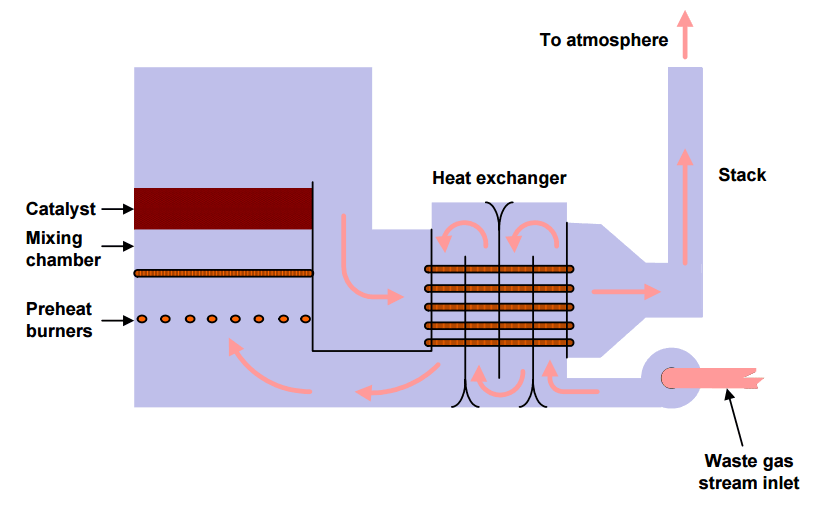
Schematic of Recuperative Catalytic Oxidizer

Catalytic oxidizer (also known as catalytic incinerator) is another category of oxidation systems that is similar to typical thermal oxidizers, but the catalytic oxidizers use a catalyst to promote the oxidation. Catalytic oxidation occurs through a chemical reaction between the VOC hydrocarbon molecules and a precious-metal catalyst bed that is internal to the oxidizer system. A catalyst is a substance that is used to accelerate the rate of a chemical reaction, allowing the reaction to occur in a normal temperature range between 340 °C (644 °F) and 540 °C (1,004 °F).

=== Regenerative catalytic oxidizer (RCO) ===
The catalyst can be used in a Regenerative Thermal Oxidizer (RTO) to allow lower operating temperatures. This is also called Regenerative Catalytic Oxidizer or RCO. For example, the thermal ignition temperature of carbon monoxide is normally 609 °C (1,128 °F). By utilizing a suitable oxidation catalyst, the ignition temperature can be reduced to around 200 °C (392 °F). This can result in lower operating costs than a RTO. Most systems operate within the 260 °C (500 °F) to 1,000 °C (1,830 °F) degree range. Some systems are designed to operate both as RCOs and RTOs. When these systems are used special design considerations are utilized to reduce the probability of overheating (dilution of inlet gas or recycling), as these high temperatures would deactivate the catalyst, e.g. by sintering of the active material.

=== Recuperative catalytic oxidizer ===
Catalytic oxidizers can also be in the form of recuperative heat recovery to reduce the fuel requirement. In this form of heat recovery, the hot exhaust gases from the oxidizer pass through a heat exchanger to heat the new incoming air to the oxidizer.
