= Fluidized bed concentrator =

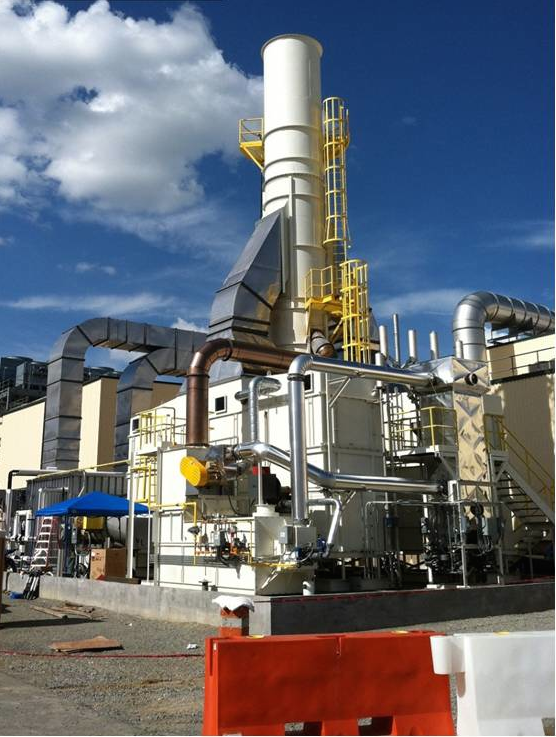
A fluidized bed concentrator for VOC control at Honda Manufacturing of Alabama.

A fluidized bed concentrator (FBC) is an industrial process for the treatment of exhaust air. The system uses a bed of activated carbon beads to adsorb volatile organic compounds (VOCs) from the exhaust gas. Differently from the fixed-bed or carbon rotor concentrators, the FBC system forces the VOC-laden air through several perforated steel trays, increasing the velocity of the air and allowing the sub-millimeter carbon beads to fluidize, or behave as if suspended in a liquid. This increases the surface area of the carbon-gas interaction, making it more effective at capturing VOCs.

== Components ==
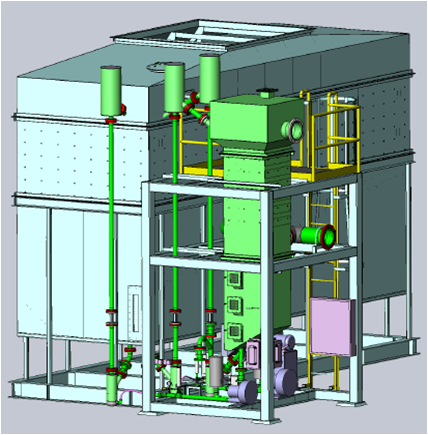
A 3D design of the fluidized bed concentrator in SolidWorks

The fluidized bed concentrator consists of five primary components:

- Adsorption tower
- Desorption tower
- Thermal oxidizer
- Carbon transport system
- Process fans: inlet adsorber, inlet desorber, outlet oxidizer to stack

== How it works ==
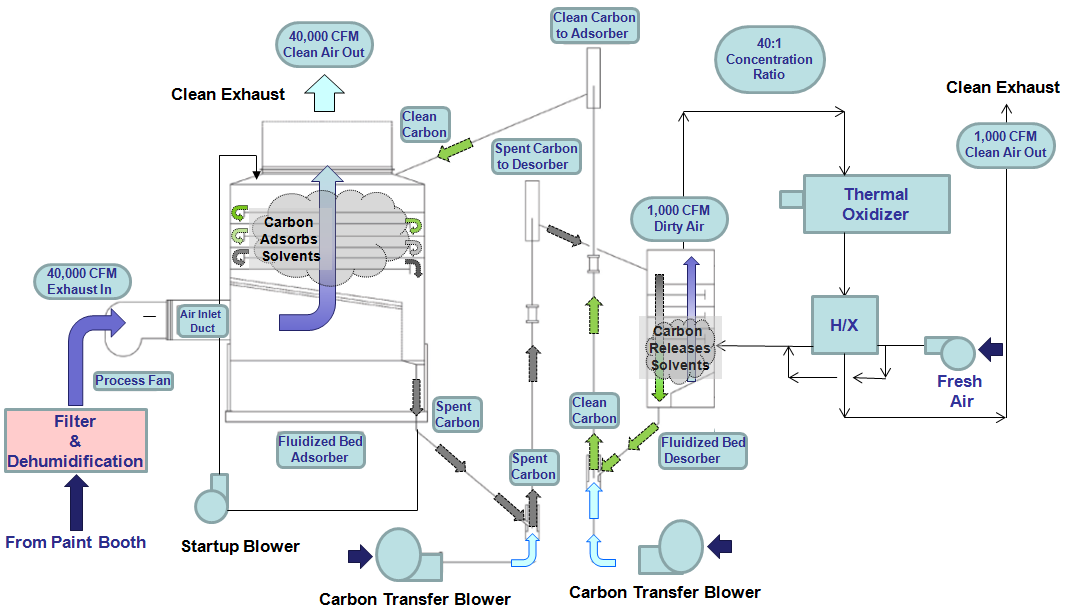
A flow schematic of process gas in the fluidized bed concentrator system.

Industrial processes requiring ventilation, including paint booths, printing, and chemical production, exhaust the ventilated air to the fluidized bed concentrator at room temperature. The air first passes into the adsorption tower, where it moves through six perforated trays of clean carbon beads. The 0.7 mm bead activated carbon (BAC) fluidizes in the trays and captures the VOCs as they intermix.

The saturated carbon beads are passed from the adsorber tower to the desorber tower, where the beads are heated to 350 °F and the VOCs are released. Typically the adsorber tower is many times larger than the desorber tower, leading to an air volume reduction and an increase in VOC concentration. The ratio of adsorber size to desorber size is called the concentration ratio, and ranges from 10:1 to 100:1.

The concentrated VOC gas stream is sent from the desorb tower to a thermal oxidizer, where the organic compounds are heated to 1400 °F and oxidized, or broken down into carbon dioxide (CO_{2}), water (H_{2}O), and by-products. In some cases, small amounts of carbon monoxide (CO), nitrogen oxide (NO_{X}), and other gases are produced.

== Emissions and energy usage ==
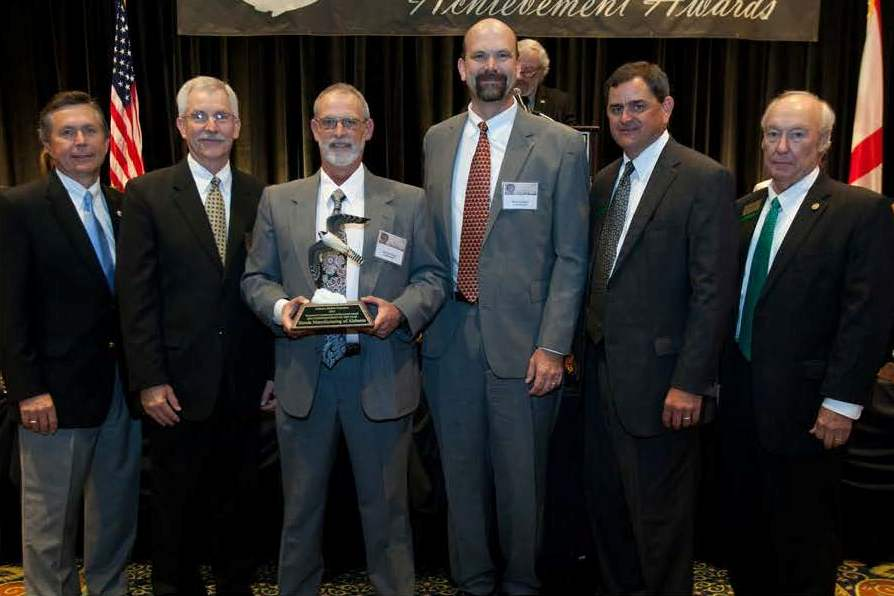
Members of the Honda Alabama Environmental Air Quality team are honored for their efforts to reduce CO_{2} and NO_{x} emissions.

The primary advantage of the FBC over traditional rotor concentrators lies in its ability to achieve any concentration ratio up to the lower explosive limit (LEL). This allows Honda Alabama's paint shop to switch from oxidizing 100,000 CFM of VOCs in a regenerative thermal oxidizer (RTO), to oxidizing only 1,500 CFM of VOCs in a small thermal oxidizer, at a much higher concentration. Reducing the volume of air to be oxidized from 100,000 CFM to 1,500 CFM (66:1 concentration ratio), allows for a much lower energy usage and consequently, fewer CO_{2} and NO_{X} emissions.

Despite an increase in Line 2 production, Honda is realizing a reduction in plant VOC emissions of nearly 60 metric tons annually as a result of the installation of the FBC system. Also, the new [FBC] system uses approximately 20% of the energy of an RTO system. - Honda Manufacturing of Alabama

== Industries served ==
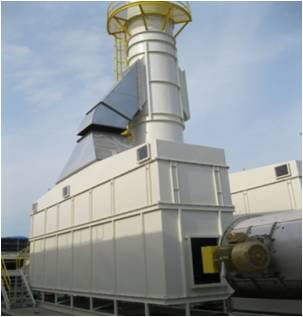
The adsorber tower and stack of a fluidized bed concentrator

- Paint finishing
  - Automotive
  - Aerospace
  - Heavy machinery
  - Transportation
- Printing
- Chemical production
- Semiconductor
- Food processing

== See also ==
- Volatile organic compound
- National Emissions Standards for Hazardous Air Pollutants
- Air pollution in the United States
- Activated carbon
- Air pollution
