= Fluidized bed combustion =

Technology used to burn solid fuels

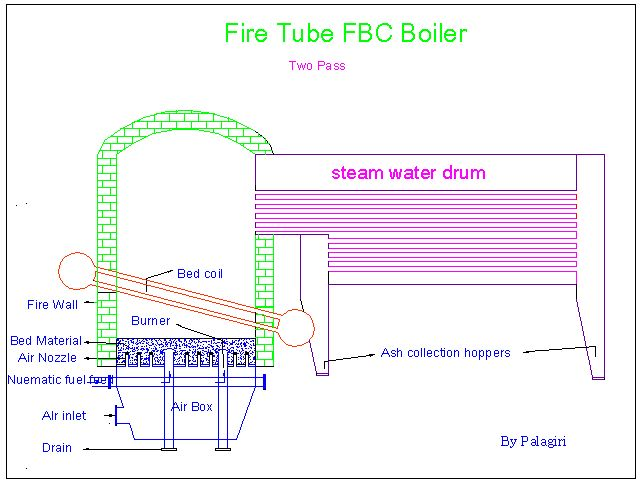
FBC smoke tube boiler

Fluidized bed combustion (FBC) is a combustion technology used to burn solid fuels.

In its most basic form, fuel particles are suspended in a hot, bubbling fluidity bed of ash and other particulate materials (sand, limestone etc.) through which jets of air are blown to provide the oxygen required for combustion or gasification. The resultant fast and intimate mixing of gas and solids promotes rapid heat transfer and chemical reactions within the bed. FBC plants are capable of burning a variety of low-grade solid fuels, including most types of coal, coal waste and woody biomass, at high efficiency and without the necessity for expensive fuel preparation (e.g., pulverising). In addition, for any given thermal duty, FBCs are smaller than the equivalent conventional furnace, so may offer significant advantages over the latter in terms of cost and flexibility.

FBC reduces the amount of sulfur emitted in the form of SO_{x} emissions. Limestone is used to precipitate out sulfate during combustion, which also allows more efficient heat transfer from the boiler to the apparatus used to capture the heat energy (usually water tubes). The heated precipitate coming in direct contact with the tubes (heating by conduction) increases the efficiency. This allows coal plants to burn at cooler temperatures, reducing NO_{x} emissions in exchange for increasing PAH emissions. FBC boilers can burn fuels other than coal, and the lower temperatures of combustion (800 °C; 1,470 °F) have other added benefits as well.

== Benefits ==
There are two reasons for the rapid increase of FBC in combustors. First, the liberty of choice in respect of fuels in general, not only the possibility of using fuels which are difficult to burn using other technologies, is an important advantage of fluidized bed combustion. The second reason, which has become increasingly important, is the possibility of achieving, during combustion, a low emission of nitric oxides and the possibility of removing sulfur in a simple manner by using limestone as bed material.

Fluidized-bed combustion evolved from efforts to find a combustion process able to control pollutant emissions without external emission controls (such as scrubbers-flue gas desulfurization). The technology burns fuel at temperatures of 1,400 to 1,700 °F (760 to 930 °C), well below the threshold where nitrogen oxides form (at approximately 2,500 °F (1,370 °C), the nitrogen and oxygen atoms in the combustion air combine to form nitrogen oxide pollutants); it also avoids the ash melting problems related to high combustion temperature. The mixing action of the fluidized bed brings the flue gases into contact with a sulfur-absorbing chemical, such as limestone or dolomite. More than 95% of the sulfur pollutants in coal can be captured inside the boiler by the sorbent. The reductions may be less substantial than they seem, however, as they coincide with dramatic increases in polycyclic aromatic hydrocarbons, and possibly other carbon compound emissions.

Commercial FBC units operate at competitive efficiencies, cost less than today's conventional boiler units, and have SO_{2} and NO_{2} emissions below levels mandated by Federal standards. However, they have some disadvantages such as erosion on the tubes inside the boiler, uneven temperature distribution caused by clogs on the air inlet of the bed, long starting times reaching up to 48 hours in some cases.

1. FBC has a lower combustion temperature of 750 °C whereas an ordinary boiler operates at 850 °C.
2. FBC has low sintering process (melting of Ash).
3. Lower production of NO_{x} due to lower temperature.
4. Lower production of SO_{x} due to capture by limestone.
5. Higher combustion efficiency due to 10 times more heat transfer than other combustion processes because of burning particle.
6. Less area is required for FBC due to high coefficient of convective heat transfer.
7. Iso-thermal bed combustion as temperature in free belt and active belt remain constant.

== Types ==
FBC systems fit into essentially two major groups, atmospheric systems (FBC) and pressurized systems (PFBC), and two minor subgroups, bubbling (BFB) and circulating fluidized bed (CFB).

=== Atmospheric Fluidized Bed Combustion (AFBC) ===
Atmospheric fluidized beds use limestone or dolomite to capture sulfur released by the combustion of coal. Jets of air suspend the mixture of sorbent and burning coal during combustion, converting the mixture into a suspension of red-hot particles that flow like a fluid. These boilers operate at atmospheric pressure.

=== Pressurized Fluidized Bed Combustion ===
The first-generation PFBC system also uses a sorbent and jets of air to suspend the mixture of sorbent and burning coal during combustion. However, these systems operate at elevated pressures and produce a high-pressure gas stream at temperatures that can drive a gas turbine. Steam generated from the heat in the fluidized bed is sent to a steam turbine, creating a highly efficient combined cycle system.

==== Advanced PFBC ====
- A 1½ generation PFBC system increases the gas turbine firing temperature by using natural gas in addition to the vitiated air from the PFB combustor. This mixture is burned in a topping combustor to provide higher inlet temperatures for greater combined cycle efficiency. However, this uses natural gas, usually a higher priced fuel than coal.
- APFBC. In more advanced second-generation PFBC systems, a pressurized carbonizer is incorporated to process the feed coal into fuel gas and char. The PFBC burns the char to produce steam and to heat combustion air for the gas turbine. The fuel gas from the carbonizer burns in a topping combustor linked to a gas turbine, heating the gases to the combustion turbine's rated firing temperature. Heat is recovered from the gas turbine exhaust in order to produce steam, which is used to drive a conventional steam turbine, resulting in a higher overall efficiency for the combined cycle power output. These systems are also called APFBC, or advanced circulating pressurized fluidized-bed combustion combined cycle systems. An APFBC system is entirely coal-fueled.
- GFBCC. Gasification fluidized-bed combustion combined cycle systems, GFBCC, have a pressurized circulating fluidized-bed (PCFB) partial gasifier feeding fuel syngas to the gas turbine topping combustor. The gas turbine exhaust supplies combustion air for the atmospheric circulating fluidized-bed combustor that burns the char from the PCFB partial gasifier.
- CHIPPS. A CHIPPS system is similar, but uses a furnace instead of an atmospheric fluidized-bed combustor. It also has gas turbine air preheater tubes to increase gas turbine cycle efficiency. CHIPPS stands for combustion-based high performance power system.

== See also ==
- Chemical looping combustion
- Circulating fluidized bed
- Fluidized bed reactor
- FutureGen zero-emissions coal-fired power plant
- Grate firing
- JEA Northside Generating Station (Jacksonville)
- Pulverised fuel firing

== References (Requires update in links) ==
- National Energy Technology Laboratory
- EU regulation: Pollution from large combustion plants
- Simulation of a commercial CFB coal combustor
