= Fluidized bed reactor =

Chemical reactor

A fluidized bed reactor (FBR) is a type of reactor device that can be used to carry out a variety of multiphase chemical reactions. In this type of reactor, a fluid (gas or liquid) is passed through a solid granular material (usually a catalyst) at high enough speeds to suspend the solid and cause it to behave as though it were a fluid. This process, known as fluidization, imparts many important advantages to an FBR. As a result, FBRs are used for many industrial applications.

Basic diagram of a fluidized bed reactor

== Basic principles ==
The solid substrate material (the catalytic material upon which chemical species react) in the fluidized bed reactor is typically supported by a porous plate, known as a distributor. The fluid is then forced through the distributor up through the solid material. At lower fluid velocities, the solids remain in place as the fluid passes through the voids in the material. This is known as a packed bed reactor. As the fluid velocity is increased, the reactor will reach a stage where the force of the fluid on the solids is enough to balance the weight of the solid material. This stage is known as incipient fluidization and occurs at this minimum fluidization velocity. Once this minimum velocity is surpassed, the contents of the reactor bed begin to expand and swirl around much like an agitated tank or boiling pot of water. The reactor is now a fluidized bed. Depending on the operating conditions and properties of solid phase various flow regimes can be observed in this reactor.

== History and current uses ==
Fluidized bed reactors are relatively new in the chemical engineering field. The first fluidized bed gas generator was developed by Fritz Winkler in Germany in the 1920s. One of the first United States fluidized bed reactors used in the petroleum industry was the Catalytic Cracking Unit, created in Baton Rouge, LA in 1942 by the Standard Oil Company of New Jersey (now ExxonMobil). This FBR and the many to follow were developed for the oil and petrochemical industries. Here catalysts were used to reduce petroleum to simpler compounds through a process known as cracking. The invention of this technology made it possible to significantly increase the production of various fuels in the United States.

Today, fluidized bed reactors are still used to produce gasoline and other fuels, along with many other chemicals. Many industrially produced polymers are made using FBR technology, such as rubber, vinyl chloride, polyethylene, styrenes, and polypropylene. Various utilities also use FBRs for coal gasification, nuclear power plants, and water and waste treatment settings. Used in these applications, fluidized bed reactors allow for a cleaner, more efficient process than previous standard reactor technologies.

Advantages of a fluidized bed reactor design include compatibility with continuous production and uniform mixing and temperature, compared with packed beds. However, fluidized beds are often larger and more energy-intensive than other reactor designs, and are susceptible to particle entrainment or wear of the internal surfaces due to the suspended solid. Pressure-loss scenarios, in which fluid pressure drops, may lead to bed collapse and potentially dangerous consequences, such as thermal runaway in an exothermic reaction.

== Current research and trends ==
Due to the advantages of fluidized bed reactors, a large amount of research is devoted to this technology. Most current research aims to quantify and explain the behavior of the phase interactions in the bed. Specific research topics include particle size distributions, various transfer coefficients, phase interactions, velocity and pressure effects, and computer modeling. The aim of this research is to produce more accurate models of the inner movements and phenomena of the bed. This will enable chemical engineers to design better, more efficient reactors that may effectively deal with the current disadvantages of the technology and expand the range of FBR use.

== See also ==
- Chemical engineering
- Chemical looping combustion
- Chemical reactor
- Fluidized bed combustion
- Siemens process
