= Chemical looping combustion =

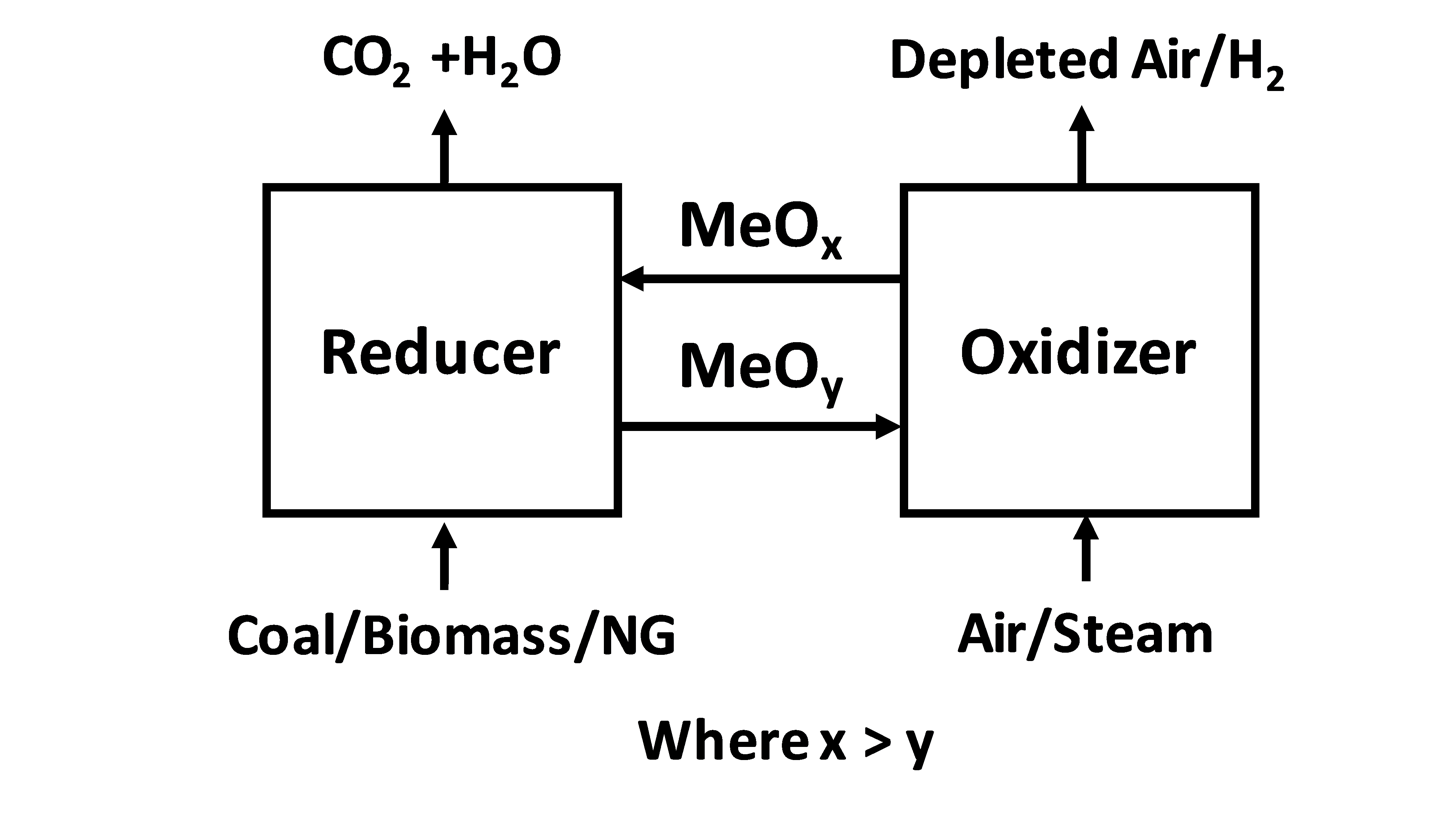
Fig 1. Diagram of CLC reactor system

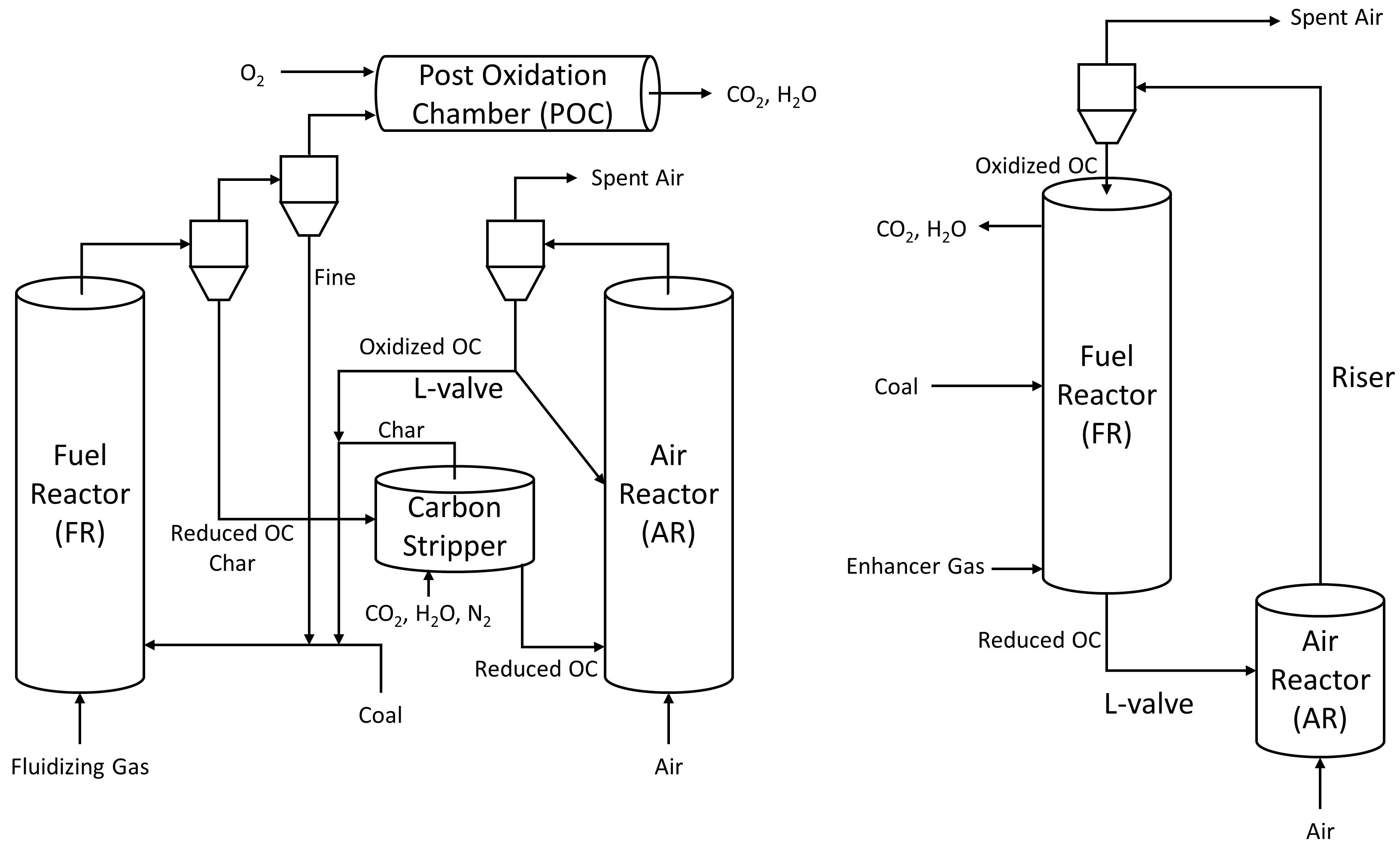
Fig 2. (Left) Dual fluidized bed design, the Darmstadt chemical looping combustion pilot plant and (Right) interconnected moving bed-fluidized bed design, the Ohio State University Coal Direct Chemical Looping pilot plant

Chemical looping combustion (CLC) is a technological process typically employing a dual fluidized bed system. CLC operated with an interconnected moving bed with a fluidized bed system, has also been employed as a technology process. In CLC, a metal oxide is employed as a bed material providing the oxygen for combustion in the fuel reactor. The reduced metal is then transferred to the second bed (air reactor) and re-oxidized before being reintroduced back to the fuel reactor completing the loop. Fig 1 shows a simplified diagram of the CLC process. Fig 2 shows an example of a dual fluidized bed circulating reactor system and a moving bed-fluidized bed circulating reactor system.

Isolation of the fuel from air simplifies the number of chemical reactions in combustion. Employing oxygen without nitrogen and the trace gases found in air eliminates the primary source for the formation of nitrogen oxide (NO_{x}), produces a flue gas composed primarily of carbon dioxide and water vapor; other trace pollutants depend on the fuel selected.

== Description ==
Chemical looping combustion (CLC) uses two or more reactions to perform the oxidation of hydrocarbon-based fuels. In its simplest form, an oxygen-carrying species (normally a metal) is first oxidized in the air forming an oxide. This oxide is then reduced using a hydrocarbon as a reducer in a second reaction. As an example, an iron based system burning pure carbon would involve the two redox reactions:

C(s) + Fe_{2}O_{3}(s) → Fe_{3}O_{4}(s) + CO_{2}(g)	1

Fe_{3}O_{4}(s) + O_{2}(g) → Fe_{2}O_{3}(s)	2

If (1) and (2) are added together, the reaction set reduces to straight carbon oxidation i.e.:

C(s) + O_{2}(g) → CO_{2}(g)	3

CLC was first studied as a way to produce CO_{2} from fossil fuels, using two interconnected fluidized beds. Later it was proposed as a system for increasing power station efficiency. The gain in efficiency is possible due to the enhanced reversibility of the two redox reactions; in traditional single stage combustion, the release of a fuel's energy occurs in a highly irreversible manner - departing considerably from equilibrium. In CLC, if an appropriate oxygen carrier is chosen, both redox reactions can be made to occur almost reversibly and at relatively low temperatures. Theoretically, this allows a power station using CLC to approach the ideal work output for an internal combustion engine without exposing components to excessive working temperatures.

=== Thermodynamics ===
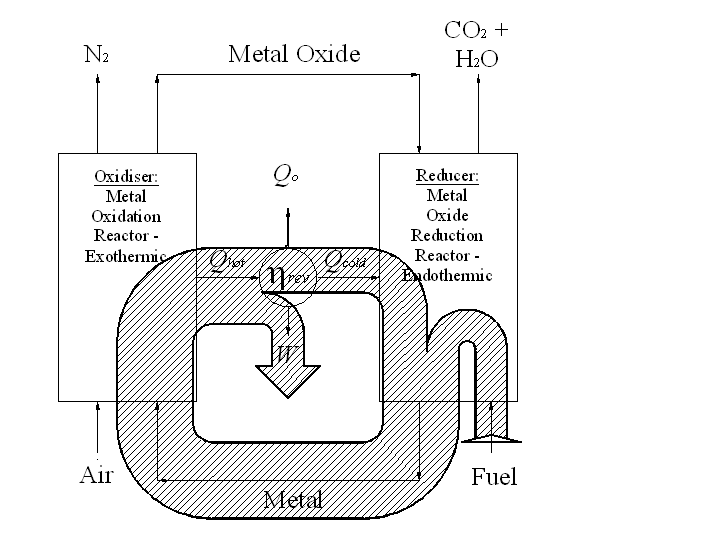
Fig 3. Sankey diagram of energy fluxes in a reversible CLC system.

Fig 3 illustrates the energy exchanges in a CLC system graphically and shows a Sankey diagram of the energy fluxes occurring in a reversible CLC based engine. Studying Fig 1, a heat engine is arranged to receive heat at high temperatures from the exothermic oxidation reaction. After converting part of this energy to work, the heat engine rejects the remaining energy as heat. Almost all of this heat rejection can be absorbed by the endothermic reduction reaction occurring in the reducer. This arrangement requires the redox reactions to be exothermic and endothermic respectively, but this is normally the case for most metals. Some additional heat exchange with the environment is required to satisfy the second law; theoretically, for a reversible process, the heat exchange is related to the standard state entropy change, ΔS^{o}, of the primary hydrocarbon oxidation reaction as follows:

Q_{o} = T_{o}ΔS^{o}

However, for most hydrocarbons, ΔS^{o} is a small value and, as a result, an engine of high overall efficiency is theoretically possible.

=== CO_{2} capture ===
Although proposed as a means of increasing efficiency, in recent years, interest has been shown in CLC as a carbon capture technique. Carbon capture is facilitated by CLC because the two redox reactions generate two intrinsically separated flue gas streams: a stream from the air reactor, consisting of atmospheric N_{2} and residual O_{2}, but sensibly free of CO_{2}; and a stream from the fuel reactor predominately containing CO_{2} and H_{2}O with very little diluent nitrogen. The air reactor flue gas can be discharged to the atmosphere causing minimal CO_{2} pollution. The reducer exit gas contains almost all of the CO_{2} generated by the system and CLC therefore can be said to exhibit 'inherent carbon capture', as water vapor can easily be removed from the second flue gas via condensation, leading to a stream of almost pure CO_{2}. This gives CLC clear benefits when compared with competing carbon capture technologies, as the latter generally involve a significant energy penalty associated with either post combustion scrubbing systems or the work input required for air separation plants. This has led to CLC being proposed as an energy efficient carbon capture technology, able to capture nearly all of the CO_{2}, for example, from a Coal Direct Chemical Looping (CDCL) plant. A continuous 200-hour demonstration results of a 25 kW_{th} CDCL sub-pilot unit indicated nearly 100% coal conversion to CO_{2} with no carbon carryover to the air reactor.

=== Technology development ===
First operation of chemical-looping combustion with gaseous fuels was demonstrated in 2003, and later with solid fuels in 2006. Total operational experience in 49 pilots of 0.3 to 3 MW is more than 11,000 h. Oxygen carrier materials used in operation include monometallic oxides of nickel, copper, manganese and iron, as well as various combined oxides including manganese oxides.combined with calcium, iron and silica. Also natural ores have been in use, especially for solid fuels, including iron ores, manganese ores and ilmenite.

=== Cost and energy penalty ===
A detailed technology assessment of chemical-looping combustion of solid fuel, i.e. coal, for a 1000 MW_{th} power plant shows that the added CLC reactor costs as compared to a normal circulating fluidized bed boiler are small, because of the similarities of the technologies. Major costs are instead CO_{2} compression, needed in all CO_{2} capture technologies, and oxygen production. Molecular oxygen production may also be needed in certain CLC configuration for polishing the product gas from the fuel reactor. In all the added costs were estimated to 20 €/tonne of CO_{2} whereas the energy penalty was 4%.

=== Variants and related technologies ===
A variant of CLC is Chemical-Looping Combustion with Oxygen Uncoupling (CLOU) where an oxygen carrier is used that releases gas-phase oxygen in the fuel reactor, e.g. CuO/Cu_{2}O. This is helpful for achieving high gas conversion, and especially when using solid fuels, where slow steam gasification of char can be avoided. CLOU operation with solid fuels shows high performance

Chemical Looping can also be used to produce hydrogen in Chemical-Looping Reforming (CLR) processes. In one configuration of the CLR process, hydrogen is produced from coal and/or natural gas using a moving bed fuel reactor integrated with a steam reactor and a fluidized bed air reactor. This configuration of CLR can produce greater than 99% purity H_{2} without the need for CO_{2} separation.

Another CLR process is based on conventional steam methane reforming (SMR), with chemical-looping combustion replacing the reformer furnace. Thus, the heat for the reforming is transferred in fluidized-bed heat exchangers (FBHEs) connected to the air reactor and the fuel used is the off-gas from the reforming plus additional methane. This configuration can give higher energy efficiency than conventional SMR, because the furnace temperature can be reduced. Consequently, a negative CO_{2} capture cost could be possible. Lower temperature and more efficient heat transfer in FBHEs may also allow for thinner and shorter reformer tubes and reduce need for catalyst.

Comprehensive overviews of the field are given in recent reviews on chemical looping technologies.

In summary, CLC can achieve both an increase in power station efficiency simultaneously with low energy penalty carbon capture. Challenges with CLC include the operation of dual fluidized bed (maintaining carrier fluidization while avoiding crushing and attrition), and maintaining carrier stability over many cycles.

== See also ==
- Chemical looping reforming and gasification
- Combustion
- Oxy-fuel combustion
- Oxidizing agent
- Redox (reduction/oxidation reaction)
- Carbon capture and storage
- Lane hydrogen producer
