= Fluidization =

Conversion of a granular material from a solid-like to liquid-like state

Schematic drawing of a fluidized bed reactor

Fluidization (or fluidisation) is a process similar to liquefaction whereby a granular material is converted from a static solid-like state to a dynamic fluid-like state. This process occurs when a fluid (liquid or gas) is passed up through the granular material.

When a gas flow is introduced through the bottom of a bed of solid particles, it will move upwards through the bed via the empty spaces between the particles. At low gas velocities, aerodynamic drag on each particle is also low, and thus the bed remains in a fixed state. Increasing the velocity, the aerodynamic drag forces will begin to counteract the gravitational forces, causing the bed to expand in volume as the particles move away from each other. Further increasing the velocity, it will reach a critical value at which the upward drag forces will exactly equal the downward gravitational forces, causing the particles to become suspended within the fluid. At this critical value, the bed is said to be fluidized and will exhibit fluidic behavior. By further increasing gas velocity, the bulk density of the bed will continue to decrease, and its fluidization becomes more intense until the particles no longer form a bed and are "conveyed" upwards by the gas flow.

When fluidized, a bed of solid particles will behave as a fluid, like a liquid or gas. Like water in a bucket: the bed will conform to the volume of the chamber, its surface remaining perpendicular to gravity; objects with a lower density than the bed density will float on its surface, bobbing up and down if pushed downwards, while objects with a higher density sink to the bottom of the bed. The fluidic behavior allows the particles to be transported like a fluid, channeled through pipes, not requiring mechanical transport (e.g. conveyor belt).

A simplified every-day-life example of a gas-solid fluidized bed would be a hot-air popcorn popper. The popcorn kernels, all being fairly uniform in size and shape, are suspended in the hot air rising from the bottom chamber. Because of the intense mixing of the particles, akin to that of a boiling liquid, this allows for a uniform temperature of the kernels throughout the chamber, minimizing the amount of burnt popcorn. After popping, the now larger popcorn particles encounter increased aerodynamic drag which pushes them out of the chamber and into a bowl.

The process is also key in the formation of a sand volcano and fluid escape structures in sediments and sedimentary rocks.

== Applications ==
Most of the fluidization applications use one or more of three important characteristics of fluidized beds:

1. Fluidized solids can be easily transferred between reactors.
2. The intense mixing within a fluidized bed means that its temperature is uniform.
3. There is excellent heat transfer between a fluidized bed and heat exchangers immersed in the bed.

In the 1920s, the Winkler process was developed to gasify coal in a fluidized bed, using oxygen. It was not commercially successful.

The first large scale commercial implementation, in the early 1940s, was the fluid catalytic cracking (FCC) process, which converted heavier petroleum cuts into gasoline. Carbon-rich "coke" deposits on the catalyst particles and deactivates the catalyst in less than 1 second. The fluidized catalyst particles are shuttled between the fluidized bed reactor and a fluidized bed burner where the coke deposits are burned off, generating heat for the endothermic cracking reaction.

By the 1950s, fluidized bed technology was being applied to mineral and metallurgical processes such as drying, calcining, and sulfide roasting.

In the 1960s, several fluidized bed processes dramatically reduced the cost of some important monomers. Examples are the Sohio process for acrylonitrile and the oxychlorination process for vinyl chloride. These chemical reactions are highly exothermic and fluidization ensures a uniform temperature, minimizing unwanted side reactions, and efficient heat transfer to cooling tubes, ensuring high productivity.

In the late 1970s, a fluidized bed process for the synthesis of polyethylene dramatically reduced the cost of this important polymer, making its use economical in many new applications. The polymerization reaction generates heat and the intense mixing associated with fluidization prevents hot spots where the polyethylene particles would melt. A similar process is used for the synthesis of polypropylene.

Currently, most of the processes that are being developed for the industrial production of carbon nanotubes use a fluidized bed. Arkema uses a fluidized bed to produce 400 tonnes/year of multiwall carbon nanotubes.

A new potential application of fluidization technology is chemical looping combustion, which has not yet been commercialized. One solution to reducing the potential effect of carbon dioxide generated by fuel combustion (e.g. in power stations) on global warming is carbon dioxide sequestration. Regular combustion with air produces a gas that is mostly nitrogen (as it is air's main component at about 80% by volume), which prevents economical sequestration. Chemical looping uses a metal oxide as a solid oxygen carrier. These metal oxide particles replace air (specifically oxygen in the air) in a combustion reaction with a solid, liquid, or gaseous fuel in a fluidized bed, producing solid metal particles from the reduction of the metal oxides and a mixture of carbon dioxide and water vapor, the major products of any combustion reaction. The water vapor is condensed, leaving pure carbon dioxide which can be sequestered. The solid metal particles are circulated to another fluidized bed where they react with air (and again, specifically oxygen in the air), producing heat and oxidizing the metal particles to metal oxide particles that are recirculated to the fluidized bed combustor. A similar process is used to produce maleic anhydride through the partial oxidation of n-butane, with the circulating particles acting as both catalyst and oxygen carrier; pure oxygen is also introduced directly into the bed.

Nearly 50% of the silicon in solar cells is produced in fluidized beds. For example, metallurgical-grade silicon is first reacted to silane gas. The silane gas is thermally cracked in a fluidized bed of seed silicon particles, and the silicon deposits on the seed particles. The cracking reaction is endothermic, and heat is provided through the bed wall, typically made of graphite (to avoid metal contamination of the product silicon). The bed particle size can be controlled using attrition jets. Silane is often premixed with hydrogen to reduce the explosion risk of leaked silane in the air (see silane).

Liquid-solid fluidization has a number of applications in engineering The best-known application of liquid-solid fluidization is the backwash of granular filters using water.

Fluidization has many applications with the use of ion exchange particles for the purification and processing of many industrial liquid streams. Industries such as food & beverage, hydrometallurgical, water softening, catalysis, bio-based chemical etc. use ion exchange as a critical step in processing. Conventionally ion exchange has been used in a packed bed where a pre-clarified liquid passes downward through a column. Much work has been done at the University of Western Ontario in London Ontario, Canada on the use of a continuous fluidized ion exchange system, named "Liquid-solid circulating fluidized bed" (LSCFB), recently being called "Circulating fluidized ion exchange" (CFIX). This system has widespread applications extending the use of traditional ion exchange systems because it can handle feed streams with large amounts of suspended solids due to the use of fluidization.
