= Solar reforming =

Technology for conversion of waste

Solar reforming is the sunlight-driven conversion of diverse carbon waste resources into sustainable fuels (or energy vectors) and value-added chemicals. It uses diverse carbon waste resources such as solid, liquid, and gaseous waste streams like biomass, plastics, industrial by-products, and atmospheric carbon dioxide. Solar reforming encompasses a set of ideas focused on solar energy. It works to create a solution to address the contemporary challenges of climate change and environmental pollution by creating a sustainable circular network of waste upcycling, clean fuel (and chemical) generation, and the consequent mitigation of greenhouse emissions as is in alignment with the United Nations Sustainable Development Goals.

== Background ==
Early studies of sunlight-driven reforming of waste-derived substrates used TiO_{2} semiconductor photocatalysts, which were generally loaded with a hydrogen evolution co-catalyst such as platinum. TiO_{2} photocatalyst composites were used in the 1980s to generate hydrogen gas, driven by electron donors derived from solid waste, as reported by Kawai and Sakata of the Institute for Molecular Science, Okazaki, Japan. The photocatalytic production of hydrogen gas using raw lignocellulosic biomass (plant-based waste such as wood) was demonstrated in 2017 using visible-light responsive CdS|CdO_{x} quantum dots (tiny semiconductor particles that absorb light to drive chemical reactions) under alkaline conditions by researchers at the University of Cambridge, UK. This was followed by the utilization of less-toxic, carbon-based, visible-light absorbing photocatalyst composites, such as carbon-nitride based systems, for biomass and plastics photoreforming to hydrogen and organics by Kasap, Uekert and Reisner. In addition to variations of carbon nitride, an array of photocatalyst composites were also investigated during this period.

A major limitation of PC reforming is the use of conventional harsh alkaline pre-treatment conditions (pH >13 and high temperatures) for polymeric substrates such as condensation plastics, accounting for more than 80% of the operation costs. This was circumvented with the introduction of a new chemoenzymatic reforming pathway (a process combining chemical and enzymatic steps to break down plastics) in 2023 by Bhattacharjee, Guo, Reisner, and Hollfelder, which employed near-neutral pH and moderate temperatures for pre-treating plastics and nanoplastics. In 2020, photocatalytic conversion of addition plastics such as polyethylene and polypropylene to fuel products was also demonstrated.

The photocatalytic process offers a simple, one-pot and facile deployment scope, but has several major limitations, which make it challenging for commercial implementation. In 2021, sunlight-driven photoelectrochemical (PEC) systems/technologies operating with no external bias or voltage input were introduced by Bhattacharjee and Reisner at the University of Cambridge. These PEC reforming systems reformed diverse pre-treated waste streams (such as lignocellulose and PET plastics) to selective value-added chemicals with the simultaneous generation of green hydrogen, and achieving areal production rates one hundred to ten thousand times higher than conventional photocatalytic processes.

In 2023, PEC systems were further extended to solar reactors that could simultaneously reduce CO_{2} and reform plastics, producing glycolic acid from waste PET plastics. This inspired the direct capture and conversion of CO_{2} from flue gas and air (direct air capture) to products while reforming plastics. Additional PEC systems for biomass conversion, CO_{2} reduction, and hydrocarbon synthesis were demonstrated between 2022 and 2025.

== Concepts and technical framework ==
=== Definitions and classifications ===
Solar reforming is the sunlight-driven transformation of waste substrates to valuable products, such as sustainable fuels and chemicals, as defined by scientists Subhajit Bhattacharjee, Stuart Linley, and Erwin Reisner in their 2024 Nature Reviews Chemistry article where they conceptualized and formalized the field by introducing its concepts, classification, configurations and metrics. It generally operates without external heating and pressure, and also introduces a thermodynamic advantage over traditional green hydrogen or CO_{2} reduction fuel-producing methods such as water splitting or CO_{2} splitting, respectively. Depending on solar spectrum utilization, solar reforming can be classified into two categories: "solar catalytic reforming" and "solar thermal reforming".

Solar catalytic reforming refers to transformation processes primarily driven by ultraviolet (UV) or visible light. It also includes the subset of 'photoreforming,' encompassing utilization of high energy photons in the UV or near-UV region of the solar spectrum by semiconductor photocatalysts such as TiO_{2}. Solar thermal reforming, on the other hand, exploits the infrared (IR) region for waste upcycling to generate products of high economic value. An important aspect of solar reforming is value creation, which means that the overall value creation from product formation must be greater than substrate value destruction. In terms of deployment architectures, solar catalytic reforming can be further categorized into: photocatalytic reforming (PC reforming), photoelectrochemical reforming (PEC reforming), and photovoltaic-electrochemical reforming (PV-EC reforming).

=== Categorization and configurations ===
Solar reforming depends on the properties of the light absorber and the catalysts involved and their selection, screening, and integration to generate maximum value. The design and deployment of solar reforming technologies dictate the efficiency, scale, and target substrates/products. In this context, solar reforming, more specifically, solar catalytic reforming, can be classified into three architectures:

- Photocatalytic (PC) reforming: PC reforming is a one-pot process involving homogeneous or heterogenous photocatalyst suspensions (or immobilized photocatalysts on sheets or floating materials for easy recovery), which, under sunlight irradiation generate charge carriers (electron-hole pairs) to catalyze redox reactions (UV or near-UV based photoreforming systems generally also come under PC reforming). Despite the low cost and simplicity of PC reforming, there are major drawbacks of this approach which includes low product formation rates, poor selectivity of oxidation products or overoxidation to release CO_{2}, challenging catalyst/process optimization and harsh pre-treatment conditions.
- Photoelectrochemical (PEC) reforming: PEC reforming involves the use of PEC systems/assemblies which consist of separated (photo)electrodes generally connected using a wire and submerged in solution (electrolyte). A photoelectrode consists of a light-absorber and additional charge transport and catalyst layers to facilitate the redox processes. While conventional PEC systems typically require a bias or voltage input in addition to the energy obtained from incident light irradiation, PEC reforming ideally operates using a single light absorber without any external bias or voltage (that is, completely driven by sunlight). PEC reforming can already produce clean fuels and valuable chemicals with high selectivity and achieve production rates which are 2-4 orders of magnitude higher than conventional PC processes. The spatial separation between the redox processes offered by PEC systems allows flexibility in the screening and integration of light-absorbers and catalysts, and also better product separation. They can also benefit from better spectral utilization such as using solar concentrators or thermoelectric modules to harvest heat, thereby improving reaction kinetics and performance. The versatility and high performance of these new PEC arrangements has a wide scope of further exploitation and research.
- PV-EC reforming and extension to 'electroreforming' systems: PV-EC reforming refers to the use of electricity generated from photovoltaic panels (and therefore driven by sunlight) to drive electrochemical (electrolysis) reactions for waste reforming. The concept of PV-EC reforming can be further extended to 'electroreforming' where renewable electricity from sources other than the sun, for example, wind, hydro, nuclear, among others, is used to power the electrochemical reactions achieving valuable fuel and chemical production from waste feedstocks. While traditionally most electrolysers, including commercial ones focus on water splitting to produce hydrogen, new electrochemical systems, catalysts and concepts have emerged which have started to look into waste substrates for utilisation as sustainable feedstocks.

=== Solar reforming metrics ===
Solar reforming encompasses a range of technological processes and configurations, and because of this, suitable performance metrics can evaluate the commercial viability. In artificial photosynthesis, the most common metric is the solar-to-fuel conversion efficiency (η_{STF}) as shown below, where 'r' is the product formation rate, 'ΔG' is the Gibbs free energy change during the process, 'A' is the sunlight irradiation area and 'P' is the total light intensity flux. The η_{STF} can be adopted as a metric for solar reforming but with certain considerations. Since the ΔG values for solar reforming processes are very low (ΔG ~0 kJ mol^{‒1}), this makes the η_{STF} per definition close to zero, despite the high production rates and quantum yields. However, replacing the ΔG for product formation during solar reforming with that of product utilisation (|ΔG_{use}|; such as combustion of the hydrogen fuel generated) can give a better representation of the process efficiency.

$\eta_{\mathrm{STF}}=\frac{\mathrm{r}_{\mathrm{SR}}\left(\mathrm{mol} \cdot \mathrm{s}^{-1}\right) \times \Delta \mathrm{G}_{\mathrm{SR}}\left(\mathrm{J} \cdot \mathrm{mol}^{-1}\right)}{\mathrm{P}_{\text {total }}\left(\mathrm{W} \cdot \mathrm{m}^{-2}\right) \times \mathrm{A}\left(\mathrm{m}^2\right)}$

Since solar reforming is highly dependent on the light harvester and its area of photon collection, a more technologically relevant metric is the areal production rate (r_{areal}) as shown, where 'n' is the moles of product formed, 'A' is the sunlight irradiation area and 't' is the time.

$\mathrm{r}_{\text {areal}}=\frac{\mathrm{n}_{\text {product}}(\mathrm{mol})}{\mathrm{A}\left(\mathrm{m}^2\right) \times \mathrm{t}(\mathrm{h})}$

Although r_{areal} is a more consistent metric for solar reforming, it neglects some key parameters such as type of waste utilized, pre-treatment costs, product value, scaling, other process and separation costs, deployment variables, etc. Therefore, a more adaptable and robust metric is the solar-to-value creation rate (r_{STV}) which can encompass all these factors and provide a more holistic and practical picture from the economic or commercial point of view. The simplified equation for r_{STV} is shown below, where C_{i} and C_{k} are the costs of the product 'i' and substrate 'k', respectively. C_{p} is the pre-treatment cost for the waste substrate 'k', and n_{i} and n_{k} are amounts (in moles) of the product 'i' formed and substrate 'k' consumed during solar reforming, respectively. Note that the metric is adaptable and can be expanded to include other relevant parameters as applicable.

$r_{\mathrm{STV}}= \frac{ {\textstyle \sum_{i=1}^M \displaystyle C_i ($mol^{-1})\times n_i(mol)} - {\textstyle \sum_{k=1}^N \displaystyle \bigl(C_k+C_p\bigr) ($mol^{-1})\times n_k (mol)}}{A (m^2)\times t(h)}{}$

=== Advantages over conventional processes ===
Solar reforming offers several advantages over conventional methods of waste management or fuel/chemical production through less energy-intensive and low-carbon alternative to methods of waste reforming such as pyrolysis and gasification, which require high energy input. Solar reforming also provides several benefits over traditional green hydrogen production methods such as water splitting (H_{2}O → H_{2} + 1/2O_{2}, ΔG° = 237 kJ mol^{−1}) because of a thermodynamic advantage which circumvents the energetically and kinetically demanding water oxidation half reaction (E^{0} = +1.23 V vs. reversible hydrogen electrode (RHE)) by energetically neutralizing oxidation of waste-derived organics (C_{x}H_{y}O_{z} + (2x−z)H_{2}O → (2x−z+y/2)H_{2} + xCO_{2}; ΔG° ~0 kJ mol^{−1}). This results in better performance in terms of higher production rates, and also translates to other similar processes which depend on water oxidation as the counter-reaction such as CO_{2} splitting.

Furthermore, concentrated streams of hydrogen produced from solar reforming are safer than explosive mixtures of oxygen and hydrogen (from traditional water splitting), which otherwise require additional separation costs. The added economic advantage of forming two different valuable products, for example, gaseous reductive fuels and liquid oxidative chemicals, which simultaneously make solar reforming suitable for commercial applications.

== Introduction of 'photon economy' ==
An important concept introduced in the context of solar reforming is the 'photon economy', which, as defined by Bhattacharjee, Linley, and Reisner, is the maximum utilization of all incident photons for maximizing product formation and value creation. An ideal solar reforming process is one where the light absorber can absorb incident UV and visible light photons with maximum quantum yield, generating high charge carrier concentration to drive redox half-reactions at maximum rate. On the other hand, the residual, non-absorbed low-energy IR photons may be used for boosting reaction kinetics, waste pre-treatment or other means of value creation (for example, desalination, etc.). Therefore, proper light and thermal management through various means (such as using solar concentrators, thermoelectric modules, among others) is encouraged to have both an atom economical and photon economical approach to extract maximum value from solar reforming processes.

== Outlook and future scope ==
Deployment of any solar reforming (PC, PEC, or PV-EC) is speculative and depends on many factors. Solar reforming may not be only limited to the conventional chemical pathways listed, and may also include other relevant industrial processes such as light-driven organic transformations, flow photochemistry, and integration with industrial electrolysis, among others. The products from conventional solar reforming such as green hydrogen or other platform chemicals have a broad value-chain. It is also now understood that sustainable fuel/chemical producing technologies of the future will rely on biomass, plastics, and CO_{2} as key carbon feedstocks to replace fossil fuels. Therefore, with sunlight being abundant and the cheapest source of energy, solar reforming is well-positioned to drive decarbonization and facilitate the transition from a linear to circular economy in the coming decades.

== See also ==
- Artificial photosynthesis
- Circular economy
- Conference of the parties
- Electrochemical reduction of carbon dioxide
- Electrochemistry
- Hydrogen economy
- Net zero emissions
- Photocatalysis
- Photoelectrochemistry
- Solar fuel
