= Reduction of carbon dioxide =

Reduction of carbon dioxide may refer to:

- Climate change mitigation
- Electrochemical reduction of carbon dioxide
- Photochemical reduction of carbon dioxide
- Photoelectrochemical reduction of carbon dioxide
