= Solar fuel =

Synthetic chemical fuel produced from solar energy

A solar fuel is a synthetic fuel produced using solar energy, through photochemical (i.e. photon activation of certain chemical reactions), photobiological (i.e., artificial photosynthesis), electrochemical (i.e. using solar electricity to drive an endogenic reaction such as hydroelectrolysis), or thermochemical methods (i.e., through the use of solar heat supplied by concentrated solar thermal energy to drive a chemical reaction). Sunlight is the primary energy source, with its radiant energy being transduced to chemical energy stored in bonds, typically by reducing protons to hydrogen, or carbon dioxide to organic compounds.

A solar fuel can be produced and stored for later use, when sunlight is not available, making it an alternative to fossil fuels and batteries. Examples of such fuels are hydrogen, ammonia, and hydrazine. Diverse photocatalysts are being developed to carry these reactions in a sustainable, environmentally friendly way.

== Overview ==
The world's dependence on the declining reserves of fossil fuels poses not only environmental problems but also geopolitical ones. Solar fuels, in particular hydrogen, are viewed as an alternative source of energy for replacing fossil fuels especially where storage is essential. Electricity can be produced directly from sunlight through photovoltaics, but this form of energy is rather inefficient to store compared to hydrogen. A solar fuel can be produced when and where sunlight is available, and stored and transported for later usage. This makes it much more convenient, because it can be used in situations where direct sunlight is not available.

The most widely researched solar fuels are hydrogen, because the only product of using this fuel is water, and products of photochemical carbon dioxide reduction, which are more conventional fuels like methane and propane. Upcoming research also involves ammonia and related substances (i.e. hydrazine). These can address the challenges that come with hydrogen, by being a more compact and safer way of storing hydrogen. Direct ammonia fuel cells are also being researched.

Solar fuels can be produced via direct or indirect processes. Direct processes harness the energy in sunlight to produce a fuel without intermediary energy conversions. Solar thermochemistry uses the heat of the sun directly to heat a receiver adjacent to the solar reactor where the thermochemical process is performed. In contrast, indirect processes have solar energy converted to another form of energy first (such as biomass or electricity) that can then be used to produce a fuel. Indirect processes have been easier to implement but have the disadvantage of being less efficient than the direct method. Therefore, direct methods should be considered more interesting than their less efficient counterparts. New research therefore focusses more on this direct conversion, but also in fuels that can be used immediately to balance the power grid.

== Hydrogen production ==
=== Photoelectrochemical ===
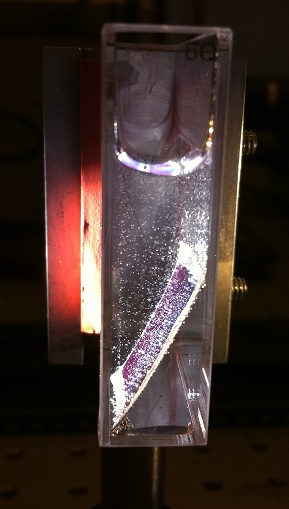
A sample of a photoelectric cell in a lab environment. Catalysts are added to the cell, which is submerged in water and illuminated by simulated sunlight. The bubbles seen are oxygen (forming on the front of the cell) and hydrogen (forming on the back of the cell).

In a solar photoelectrochemical process, hydrogen can be produced by electrolysis. To use sunlight in this process, a photoelectrochemical cell can be used, where one photosensitized electrode converts light into an electric current that is then used for water splitting. One such type of cell is the dye-sensitized solar cell. This is an indirect process, since it produces electricity that then is used to form hydrogen. Another indirect process using sunlight is conversion of biomass to biofuel using photosynthetic organisms; however, most of the energy harvested by photosynthesis is used in life-sustaining processes and therefore lost for energy use.

A semiconductor can also be used as the photosensitizer. When a semiconductor is hit by a photon with an energy higher than the bandgap, an electron is excited to the conduction band and a hole is created in the valence band. Due to band bending, the electrons and holes move to the surface, where these charges are used to split the water molecules. Many different materials have been tested, but none so far have shown the requirements for practical application.

=== Photochemical ===
In a photochemical process, the sunlight is directly used to split water into hydrogen and oxygen. Because the absorption spectrum of water does not overlap with the emission spectrum of the sun, direct dissociation of water cannot take place; a photosensitizer needs to be used. Several such catalysts have been developed as proof of concept, but not yet scaled up for commercial use; nevertheless, their relative simplicity gives the advantage of potential lower cost and increased energy conversion efficiency. One such proof of concept is the "artificial leaf" developed by Nocera and coworkers: a combination of metal oxide-based catalysts and a semiconductor solar cell produces hydrogen upon illumination, with oxygen as the only byproduct.

=== Photobiological ===
In a photobiological process, the hydrogen is produced using photosynthetic microorganisms (green microalgae and cyanobacteria) in photobioreactors. Some of these organisms produce hydrogen upon switching culture conditions; for example, Chlamydomonas reinhardtii produces hydrogen anaerobically under sulfur deprivation, that is, when cells are moved from one growth medium to another that does not contain sulfur, and are grown without access to atmospheric oxygen. Another approach was to abolish activity of the hydrogen-oxidizing (uptake) hydrogenase enzyme in the diazotrophic cyanobacterium Nostoc punctiforme, so that it would not consume hydrogen that is naturally produced by the nitrogenase enzyme in nitrogen-fixing conditions. This N. punctiforme mutant could then produce hydrogen when illuminated with visible light.

Another mutant Cyanobacteria, Synechocystis, is using genes of the bacteria Rubrivivax gelatinosus CBS to produce hydrogen. The CBS bacteria produce hydrogen through the oxidation of carbon monoxide. Researchers are working to implement these genes into the Synechocystis. If these genes can be applied, it will take some effort to overcome the problems of oxygen inhibition in the production of hydrogen, but it is estimated that this process can potentially yield as much as 10% solar energy capture. This makes photobiological research a possible branch of the hydrogen production explorations. The problems of overcoming the short-term nature of algal hydrogen production are many and research is in the early stages. However, this research provides a potential way to industrialize these renewable and environmental friendly processes.

=== Thermochemical ===
In the solar thermochemical process, water is split into hydrogen and oxygen using direct solar heat, rather than electricity, inside a high temperature solar reactor which receives highly concentrated solar flux from a solar field of heliostats that focus the highly concentrated sunlight into the reactor.

The two most promising routes are the two step cerium oxide cycle and the copper chlorine hybrid cycle. For the cerium oxide cycle the first step is to strip the CeO_{3} into Ce_{2}O_{3} at more than 1400 °C. After the thermal reduction step to reduce the metal oxide, hydrogen is then produced through hydrolysis at around 800 °C. The copper chloride cycle requires a lower temperature (~500°C), which makes this process more efficient, but the cycle contains more steps and is also more complex than the cerium oxide cycle.

Because hydrogen manufacture requires continuous performance, the solar thermochemical process includes thermal energy storage. Another thermochemical method uses solar reforming of methane, a process that replicates traditional fossil fuel reforming process but substitutes solar heat.

In a November 2021 publication in Nature, Aldo Steinfeld of Swiss technological university ETH Zurich reported an artificial photosynthesis where carbon dioxide and water vapour absorbed from the air are passed over a cerium oxide catalyst heated by concentrated solar power to produce hydrogen and carbon monoxide, transformed through the Fischer-Tropsch process into complex hydrocarbons forming methanol, a liquid fuel. Scaling could produce the 414 billion L (414 million m^{3}) of aviation fuel used in 2019 with a surface of 45,000 km^{2} (17,000 sq mi): 0.5% of the Sahara Desert. One author, Philipp Furler, leads specialist Synhelion, which in 2022 was building a solar fuel production facility at Jülich, west of Cologne, before another one in Spain. Swiss International Air Lines, part of the Lufthansa Group, should become its first customer in 2023.

== Carbon dioxide reduction ==
Carbon dioxide (CO_{2}) can be reduced to carbon monoxide (CO) and other more reduced compounds, such as methane, using the appropriate photocatalysts. One early example was the use of Tris(bipyridine)ruthenium(II) chloride (Ru(bipy)_{3}Cl_{2}) and cobalt chloride (CoCl_{2}) for CO_{2} reduction to CO. In recent years many new catalysts have been found to reduce CO_{2} into CO, after which the CO could be used to make hydrocarbons using for example the Fischer-Tropsch process. The most promising system for the solar-powered reduction of CO_{2} is the combination of a photovoltaic cell with an electrochemical cell (PV+EC). Using solar-driven processes, CO_{2} can also be converted to other products such as formate and alcohols.

For the photovoltaic cell the highly efficient GaInP/GaAs/Ge solar cell has been used, but many other series-connected and/or tandem (multi-junction) PV architectures can be employed to deliver the required voltage and current density to drive the CO_{2} reduction reactions and provide reasonable product outflow. The solar cells/panels can be placed in direct contact with the electrolyzer(s), which can bring advantages in terms of system compactness and thermal management of both technologies, or separately for instance by placing the PV outdoors exposed to sunlight and the EC systems protected indoors.

The currently best performing electrochemical cell is the gas diffusion electrode (GED) flow cell. In which the CO_{2} reacts on Ag nanoparticles to produce CO. Solar to CO efficiencies of up to 19% have been reached, with minimal loss in activity after 20h.

CO can also be produced without a catalyst using microwave plasma driven dissociation of CO_{2}. This process is relatively efficient, with an electricity to CO efficiency of up to 50%, but with low conversion around 10%. These low conversions are not ideal, because CO and CO_{2} are hard to separate at large scale in an efficient manner. The big upside of this process is that it can be turned off and on quite rapidly and does not use scarce materials. The (weakly ionised) plasma is produced using microwaves, these microwaves can accelerate the free electrons in the plasma. These electrons interact with the CO_{2} which vibrationally excite the CO_{2}, this leads to dissociation of the CO_{2} to CO. The excitation and dissociation happens fast enough that only a little bit of the energy is converted to heat, which keeps the efficiency high. The dissociation also produces an oxygen radical, which reacts with CO_{2} to CO and O_{2}.

Also in this case, the use of microorganisms has been explored. Using genetic engineering and synthetic biology techniques, parts of or whole biofuel-producing metabolic pathways can be introduced in photosynthetic organisms. One example is the production of 1-butanol in Synechococcus elongatus using enzymes from Clostridium acetobutylicum, Escherichia coli and Treponema denticola. One example of a large-scale research facility exploring this type of biofuel production is the AlgaePARC in the Wageningen University and Research Centre, Netherlands.

== Ammonia and hydrazine production ==
Hydrogen rich substances as ammonia and hydrazine are great for storing hydrogen. This is due to their energy density, for ammonia at least 1.3 times that of liquid hydrogen. Hydrazine is almost twice as dense in energy compared to liquid hydrogen, however a downside is that dilution is required in the use of direct hydrazine fuel cells, which lowers the overall power one can get from this fuel cell. Besides the high volumetric density, ammonia and hydrous hydrazine have a low flammability, which makes it superior to hydrogen by lowering the storage and transportation costs.

=== Ammonia ===
Direct ammonia fuel cells are researched for this exact reason and new studies presented a new integrated solar-based ammonia synthesis and fuel cell. The solar base follows from excess solar power that is used to synthesize ammonia. This is done by using an ammonia electrolytic cell (AEC) in combination with a proton exchange membrane (PEM) fuel cell. When a dip in solar power occurs, a direct ammonia fuel cell kicks into action providing the lacking energy. This recent research (2020) is a clear example of efficient use of energy, which is essentially done by temporary storage and use of ammonia as a fuel. Storage of energy in ammonia does not degrade over time, which is the case with batteries and flywheels. This provides long-term energy storage. This compact form of energy has the additional advantage that excess energy can easily be transported to other locations. This needs to be done with high safety measures due to the toxicity of ammonia for humans. Further research needs to be done to complement this system with wind energy and hydro-power plants to create a hybrid system to limit the interruptions in power supply. It is necessary to also investigate on the economic performance of the proposed system. Some scientists envision a new ammonia economy that is almost the same as the oil industry, but with the enormous advantage of inexhaustible carbon-free power. This so called green ammonia is considered as a potential fuel for super large ships. South Korean shipbuilder DSME plans on commercializing these ships by 2025.

=== Hydrazine ===
Another way of storing energy is with the use of hydrazine. This molecule is related to ammonia and has the potential to be equally as useful as ammonia. It can be created from ammonia and hydrogen peroxide or via chlorine based oxidations. This makes it an even denser energy storing fuel. The downside of hydrazine is that it is very toxic and that it will react with oxygen quite violently. This makes it an ideal fuel for oxygen low area's such as space. Recent launched Iridium NEXT satellites have hydrazine as their source of energy. However toxic, this fuel has great potential, because safety measures can be increased sufficiently to safely transport and convert hydrazine back into hydrogen and ammonia. Researchers discovered a way to decompose hydrazine with a photo catalysis system that works over the entire visible-light region. This means that sunlight can not only be used to produce hydrazine, but also to produce hydrogen from this fuel. The decomposition of hydrazine is done with a p-n bilayer consisting of fullerene (C_{60}), also known as "buckeyballs" which is a n-type semiconductor and zinc phthalocyanine (ZnPc) which is a p-type semiconductor creating an organic photo catalysis system. This system uses visible light irradiation to excite electrons to the n-type semiconductor creating an electric current. The holes created in the p-type semiconductor are forced in the direction of the so called Nafion part of the device, which oxidizes hydrazine to nitrogen gas and dissolved hydrogen ions. This was done in the first compartment of the fuel cell. The hydrogen ions travel through a salt bridge to another compartment to be reduced to hydrogen gas by the electrons, gained by the interaction with light, from the first compartment. Thus creating hydrogen, which can be used in fuel cells. This promising studies shows that hydrazine is a solar fuel that has great potential to become very useful in the energy transition.

A different approach to hydrazine are the direct fuel cells. The concepts for these cells have been developed since the 1960s. Recent studies provide much better direct hydrazine fuel cells, for example with the use of hydrogen peroxide as an oxidant. Making the anode basic and the cathode acidic increased the power density a lot, showing high peaks of around 1 W/cm^{2} at a temperature of 80 degrees Celsius. As mentioned earlier the main weakness of direct hydrazine fuel cells is the high toxicity of hydrazine and its derivatives. However hydrous hydrazine, which is a water-like liquid retains the high hydrogen density and can be stored and transported safely using the existing fuel infrastructure. Researchers also aim for self-powered fuel cells involving hydrazine. These fuel cells make use of hydrazine in two ways, namely as the fuel for a direct fuel cell and as the splitting target. This means that one only needs hydrazine to produce hydrogen with this fuel cell, so no external power is needed. This is done with the use of iron doped cobalt sulfide nanosheets. The doping with iron decreases the free-energy changes of hydrogen adsorption and hydrazine dehydrogenation. This method has a 20 hour stability and 98% Faradaic efficiency, which is comparable with the best reported claims of self-powered hydrogen generating cells.

== Other applications ==
- Electrolysis of water for hydrogen production combined with solar photovoltaics using alkaline, PEM, and SOEC electrolyzers; This basic use of solar light generated electric power to separate water into hydrogen and oxygen has proven a little bit more efficient than for example hydrogen capture by steam reforming. The alkaline production technology of hydrogen has low costs and is considered mature. This has a consequence that the yield per unit of time is significantly higher than when using PEM technology. However, PEM technology has no corrosion issues and is more efficient, whereas alkaline production technology has the disadvantage of corrosion and worse efficiency. In addition to that, PEM technology has a fast start-up and simple maintenance. Though, in bulk production the alkaline hydrogen production technology is superior.
- Heliogen claims success in the use of solar heliostats used to direct sunlight to a tower, to reach temperatures over 1000°C in the production of hydrogen. Temperatures above 2500°C can thermochemically split water into hydrogen and oxygen without the use of electricity. This can be done using the heat of nuclear power plants or by adaptive solar mirror fields to redirect the sunlight to reach high temperatures needed for these thermochemical processes. However, this way of producing hydrogen is in its infancy and it has not yet been proven that this production hydrogen is profitable and efficient, because it has to compete with other, mature technologies.

== See also ==
- Carbon-neutral fuel
- Photocatalytic water splitting
- Renewable energy
- Solar chemical
- Solar–hydrogen energy cycle
