= Solar chemical =

Solar chemical refers to a number of possible processes that harness solar energy by absorbing sunlight in a chemical reaction. The idea is conceptually similar to photosynthesis in plants, which converts solar energy into the chemical bonds of glucose molecules, but without using living organisms, which is why it is also called artificial photosynthesis.

A promising approach is to use focused sunlight to provide the energy needed to split water into its constituent hydrogen and oxygen in the presence of a metallic catalyst such as zinc. This is normally done in a two-step process so that hydrogen and oxygen are not produced in the same chamber, which creates an explosion hazard. Another approach involves taking the hydrogen created in this process and combining it with carbon dioxide to create methane. The benefit of this approach is that there is an established infrastructure for transporting and burning methane for power generation, which is not true for hydrogen. One main drawback to both of these approaches is common to most methods of energy storage: adding an extra step between energy collection and electricity production drastically decreases the efficiency of the overall process.

== Background ==
As early as 1909, the dimerization of anthracene into dianthracene was investigated as a means of storing solar energy, as well as the photodimerization of the naphthalene series. In the 1970s and 1980s a fuel had been made from another reversible chemical, the norbornadiene to quadricyclane transformation cycle, which failed because the reversal process had a low potential. Ruthenium-based molecules were also attempted but dismissed because ruthenium is both rare and too heavy of a material. In the past decade, a new hybrid nanostructure was theorized as a new approach to the previously known concept of solar energy storage.

== Chemical storage ==
Photodimerization is the light induced formation of dimers and photoisomerization is the light induced formation of isomers. While photodimerization stores the energy from sunlight in new chemical bonds, photoisomerization stores solar energy by reorienting existing chemical bonds into a higher energy configuration.

Anthracene dimerization

In order for an isomer to store energy then, it must be metastable as shown above. This results in a trade-off between the stability of the fuel isomer and how much energy must be put in to reverse the reaction when it is time to use the fuel. The isomer stores energy as strain energy in its bonds. The more strained the bonds are the more energy they can store, but the less stable the molecule is. The activation energy, Ea, is used to characterize how easy or hard it is for the reaction to proceed. If the activation energy is too small the fuel will tend to spontaneously move to the more stable state, providing limited usefulness as a storage medium. However, if the activation energy is very large, the energy expended to extract the energy from the fuel will effectively reduce the amount of energy that the fuel can store. Finding a useful molecule for a solar fuel requires finding the proper balance between the yield, the light absorption of the molecule, the stability of the molecule in the metastable state, and how many times the molecule can be cycled without degrading.

Various ketones, azepines and norbornadienes among other compounds, such as azobenzene and its derivatives, have been investigated as potential energy storing isomers. The norbornadiene-quadricyclane couple and its derivatives have been extensively investigated for solar energy storage processes. Norbornadiene is converted to quadricyclane using energy extracted from sunlight, and the controlled release of the strain energy stored in quadricyclane (about 110 kJ/mole) as it relaxes back to norbornadiene allows the energy to be extracted again for use later.

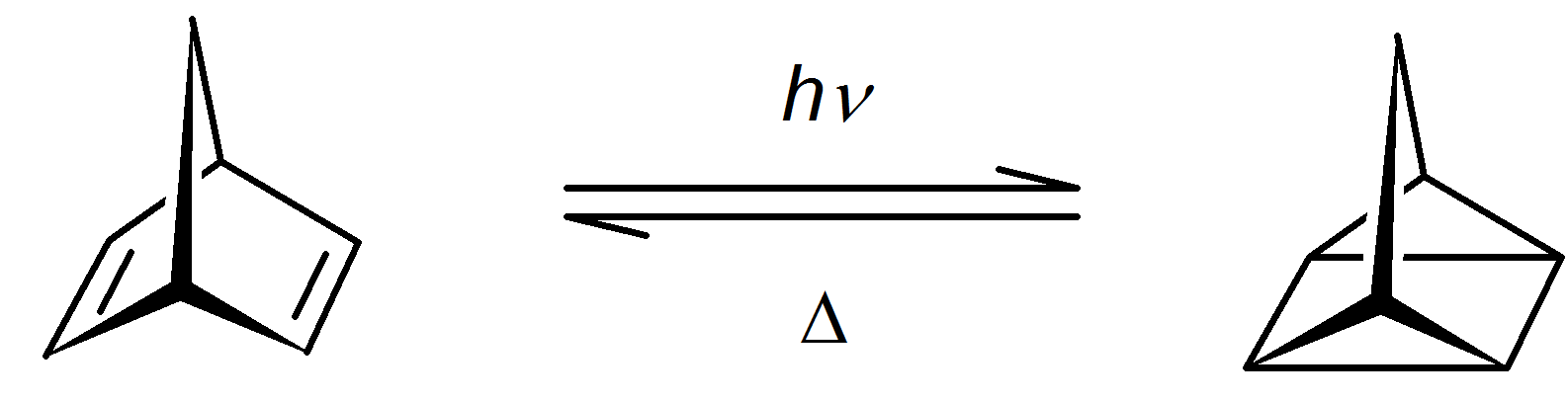
Norbornadiene - Quadricyclane couple is of potential interest for solar energy storage

Research into both the azobenzene and norbonadiene-quadricyclane systems was abandoned in the 1980s as unpractical due to problems with degradation, instability, low energy density, and cost. With recent advances in computing power though, there has been renewed interest in finding materials for solar thermal fuels. In 2011, researchers at Massachusetts Institute of Technology (MIT) used time-dependent density functional theory, which models systems at an atomic level, to design a system composed of azobenzene molecules bonded to carbon nanotube (CNT) templates. The CNT substrates will allow customizable interactions between neighboring molecules which greatly helps in fine tuning the properties of the fuel, for example an increase in the amount of energy stored. Through experimental procedures, researchers were able to get the first proof of principle that the hybrid nanostructure works as a functional thermal fuel. Azobenzenes have the advantage of absorbing wavelengths that are very abundant in sunlight. When this happens, the molecule transforms from a trans-isomer to a cis-isomer which has a higher energy state of about 0.6 eV. To bring the molecule back down to its original state, i.e. release the energy it had collected, there are a few options. The first is to apply heat but that is associated with a cost which, relative to the amount of heat that will be produced from the release, is not cost-efficient. The second, more effective option is to use a catalyst that lowers the thermal barrier and allows the heat to be released, almost like a switch. The transition back from cis to trans can also be triggered by blue visible light.

This system provides an energy density comparable to lithium-ion batteries, while simultaneously increasing the stability of the activated fuel from several minutes to more than a year and allowing for large numbers of cycles without significant degradation. Further research on greater improvement is being done by examining different possible combinations of substrates and photoactive molecules.

== Applications ==
There are a wide variety of both potential and current applications for solar chemical fuels. One significant benefit of the technology is its scalability. Since the energy can be stored and then later converted to heat when needed, it is ideal for smaller on-the-go units. Such units range from portable stoves or small personal heaters that can be charged in the sun to providing medical sanitation in off-grid areas. There are also plans to use the system developed at MIT as a window de-icing system in automobiles. It also has the ability to be scaled up and heat larger homes or buildings or even bodies of water. A solar thermal fuel would ideally be able to cycle indefinitely without degradation, making it ideal for larger-scale implementations that generally would need more replacements of other forms of storage.
