= Copper(II) tungstate =

Names
- Other names Copper tungstate

Identifiers
CAS Number	13587-35-4
3D model (JSmol)	Interactive image
ChemSpider	11230542
ECHA InfoCard	100.033.642
EC Number	237-022-7
PubChem CID	22221750
- InChI: InChI=1S/Cu.4O.W/q+2;;;2*-1; Key: OQFRENMCLHGPRB-UHFFFAOYSA-N
- SMILES: [O-][W](=O)(=O)[O-].[Cu+2]

Properties
Chemical formula	CuWO_{4}
Molar mass	311.38 g/mol
Appearance	Yellow-brown to brown-green solid
Density	7.5 g/cm^{3}
Melting point	930 °C (1,710 °F; 1,200 K)
Solubility in water	Practically insoluble in water

Hazards
- GHS labelling
Pictograms	(GHS07: Exclamation mark)
Signal word	Warning
Hazard statements	H302, H315, H319, H332, H335
Precautionary statements	P261, P280, P304+P340, P305+P351+P338, P405, P501
- Except where otherwise noted, data are given for materials in their standard state (at 25 °C [77 °F], 100 kPa). Infobox references

Copper(II) tungstate is an inorganic compound with the chemical formula CuWO_{4}. It is a yellow-brown crystalline solid that is practically insoluble in water. CuWO_{4} is an n-type semiconductor and has been investigated as a photocatalyst and as a photoanode material for photoelectrochemical water oxidation.

== Structure and properties ==
Anhydrous copper(II) tungstate crystallizes in the triclinic crystal system, in the space group P1̅. Its structure is a distorted derivative of the wolframite structure.

The unit-cell parameters have been reported as approximately a = 4.703 Å, b = 5.839 Å and c = 4.878 Å, with α = 91.8°, β = 92.5°, γ = 82.8° and Z = 2. Both Cu(II) and W(VI) are six-coordinate. The CuO_{6} octahedra are strongly elongated as a result of the Jahn–Teller effect associated with Cu^{2+}, whereas the WO_{6} octahedra are less distorted.

CuWO_{4} is structurally related to monoclinic wolframites such as MnWO_{4}, but the stronger Jahn–Teller distortion of Cu(II) lowers its symmetry to triclinic.

At high pressure, CuWO_{4} undergoes a structural phase transition at about 9 GPa from its triclinic structure to a monoclinic P2/c wolframite-type structure. A second high-pressure transformation occurs above approximately 22 GPa.

A dihydrate, CuWO_{4}·2H_{2}O, is also known. It forms a monoclinic hydrated structure and can dehydrate on heating to form anhydrous triclinic CuWO_{4}.

CuWO_{4} is a semiconductor with an indirect optical band gap of about 2.2–2.3 eV. Thin films of CuWO_{4} behave as n-type semiconductors, and their comparatively narrow band gap allows absorption of part of the visible spectrum.

== Preparation ==
Copper(II) tungstate can be prepared by precipitation from aqueous solutions of copper(II) nitrate and sodium tungstate:

Cu(NO_{3})_{2} + Na_{2}WO_{4} → CuWO_{4}↓ + 2 NaNO_{3}

The material precipitated from aqueous solution may initially contain CuWO_{4}·2H_{2}O; heating converts the hydrated material into anhydrous CuWO_{4}.

Anhydrous CuWO_{4} can also be prepared by a high-temperature solid-state reaction between copper(II) oxide and tungsten trioxide:

CuO + WO_{3} → CuWO_{4}

Solid-state syntheses are typically carried out at several hundred degrees Celsius; modern preparations commonly use temperatures around 750–800 °C.

== Applications ==
Copper(II) tungstate has attracted interest as a visible-light-active semiconductor. Polycrystalline CuWO_{4} thin films have been studied as photoanodes for the photoelectrochemical oxidation of water because of their n-type conductivity and indirect band gap of approximately 2.25 eV.

CuWO_{4} has also been investigated as a photocatalyst for degradation of organic contaminants in water. Its absorption in the visible region and comparatively good stability in aqueous media make it useful in experimental photocatalytic systems.

Other investigated applications include humidity and gas sensors, electrochemical electrodes and energy-storage materials.
