= Photoelectrochemical reduction of carbon dioxide =

Photoelectrochemical reduction of carbon dioxide, also known as photoelectrolysis of carbon dioxide, is a chemical process whereby carbon dioxide is reduced to carbon monoxide or hydrocarbons by the energy of incident light. This process requires catalysts, most of which are semiconducting materials. The feasibility of this chemical reaction was first theorised by Giacomo Luigi Ciamician, an Italian photochemist. Already in 1912 he stated that "[b]y using suitable catalyzers, it should be possible to transform the mixture of water and carbon dioxide into oxygen and methane, or to cause other endo-energetic processes."

Furthermore, the reduced species may prove to be a valuable feedstock for other processes. If the incident light utilized is solar then this process also potentially represents energy routes which combine renewable energy with CO_{2} reduction.

== Thermodynamics ==
Thermodynamic potentials for the reduction of CO_{2} to various products is given in the following table versus NHE at pH = 7. Single electron reduction of CO_{2} to CO_{2}^{●−} radical occurs at E° = −1.90 V versus NHE at pH = 7 in an aqueous solution at 25 °C under 1 atm gas pressure. The reason behind the high negative thermodynamically unfavorable single electron reduction potential of CO_{2} is the large reorganization energy between the linear molecule and bent radical anion. Proton-coupled multi-electron steps for CO_{2} reductions are generally more favorable than single electron reductions, as thermodynamically more stable molecules are produced.

Summary of thermodynamic potentials of CO_{2} reduction to various products
CO_{2} + 2 H^{+} + 2 e^{−} → CO + H_{2}O	E^{0} = −0.53 V
CO_{2} + 2 H^{+} + 2 e^{−} → HCOOH	E^{0} = −0.61 V
CO_{2} + 4 H^{+} + 4 e^{−} → HCHO + H_{2}O	E^{0} = −0.48 V
CO_{2} + 6 H^{+} + 6 e^{−} → CH_{3}OH + H_{2}O	E^{0} = −0.38 V
CO_{2} + 8 H^{+} + 8 e^{−} → CH_{4} + 2 H_{2}O	E^{0} = −0.24 V
CO_{2} + e^{−} → CO^{−}_{2}	E^{0} = −1.90 V

== Kinetics ==
Figure 3 Position of conduction and valence band of several semiconductors at pH = 1 shown vs NHE. Thermodynamic potentials for CO_{2} reduction to different products at pH = 1 vs NHE is shown beside the band edge positions of semiconductors.

Thermodynamically, proton coupled multiple-electron reduction of CO_{2} is easier than single electron reduction. But to manage multiple proton coupled multiple-electron processes is a huge challenge kinetically. This leads to a high overpotential for electrochemical heterogeneous reduction of CO_{2} to hydrocarbons and alcohols. Even further heterogeneous reduction of singly reduced CO_{2}^{●−} radical anion is difficult because of repulsive interaction between negatively biased electrode and negatively charged anion.

Figure 2 shows that in case of a p-type semiconductor/liquid junction photo generated electrons are available at the semiconductor/liquid interface under illumination. The reduction of redox species happens at less negative potential on illuminated p-type semiconductor compared to metal electrode due to the band bending at semiconductor/liquid interface. Figure 3 shows that thermodynamically, some of the proton-coupled multi-electron CO_{2} reductions are within semiconductors band gap. This makes it feasible to photo-reduce CO_{2} on p-type semiconductors. Various p-type semiconductors have been successfully employed for CO_{2} photo reduction including p-GaP, p-CdTe, p-Si, p-GaAs, p-InP, and p-SiC. Kinetically, however, these reactions are extremely slow on given semiconductor surfaces; this leads to significant overpotential for CO_{2} reduction on these semiconductor surfaces. Apart from high overpotential; these systems have a few advantages including sustainability (nothing is consumed in this system apart from light energy), direct conversion of solar energy to chemical energy, utilization of renewable energy resource for energy intensive process, stability of the process (semiconductors are really stable under illumination) etc. A different approach for photo-reduction of CO_{2} involves molecular catalysts, photosensitizers and sacrificial electron donors. In this process sacrificial electron donors are consumed during the process and photosensitizers degrade under long exposure to illumination.

== Solvent effect ==
The photo-reduction of CO_{2} on p-type semiconductor photo-electrodes has been achieved in both aqueous and non-aqueous media. Main difference between aqueous and non-aqueous media is the solubility of CO_{2}. The solubility of CO_{2} in aqueous media at 1 atm. of CO_{2} is around ≈ 35 mM; whereas solubility of CO_{2} in methanol is around 210 mM and in acetonitrile is around 210 mM.

=== Aqueous media ===
Photoreduction of CO_{2} to formic acid was demonstrated on an p-GaP photocathode in aqueous media. Apart from several other reports of CO_{2} photoreduction on p-GaP, there are other p-type semiconductors like p-GaAs, p-InP, p-CdTe, and p^{+}/p-Si have been successfully used for photoreduction of CO_{2}. The lowest potential for CO_{2} photoreduction was observed on p-GaP. This may be due to high photovoltage excepted from higher band gap p-GaP (2.2 eV) photocathode. Apart from formic acid, other products observed for CO_{2} photoreduction are formaldehyde, methanol and carbon monoxide. On p-GaP, p-GaAs and p^{+}/p-Si photocathode, the main product is formic acid with small amount of formaldehyde and methanol. However, for p-InP and p-CdTe photocathode, both carbon monoxide and formic acid are observed in similar quantities. Mechanism proposed by Hori based on CO_{2} reduction on metal electrodes predicts formation of both formic acid (in case of no adsorption of singly reduced CO_{2}^{●−} radical anion to the surface) and carbon monoxide (in case of adsorption of singly reduced CO_{2}^{●−} radical anion to the surface) in aqueous media. This same mechanism can be evoked to explain the formation of mainly formic acid on p-GaP, p-GaAs and p^{+}/p-Si photocathode owing to no adsorption of singly reduced CO_{2}^{●−} radical anion to the surface. In case of p-InP and p-CdTe photocathode, partial adsorption of CO_{2}^{●−} radical anion leads to formation of both carbon monoxide and formic acid. Low catalytic current density for CO_{2} photoreduction and competitive hydrogen generation are two major drawbacks of this system.

=== Non-aqueous media ===
Maximum catalytic current density for CO_{2} reduction that can be achieved in aqueous media is only 10 mA cm^{−2} based solubility of CO_{2} and diffusion limitations. The integrated maximum photocurrent under Air Mass 1.5 illumination, in the conventional Shockley-Quiesser limit for solar energy conversion for p-Si (1.12 eV), p-InP (1.3 eV), p-GaAs (1.4 eV), and p-GaP (2.3 eV) are 44.0 mA cm^{−2}, 37.0 mA cm^{−2}, 32.5 mA cm^{−2} and 9.0 mA cm^{−2}, respectively. Therefore, non-aqueous media such as DMF, acetonitrile, methanol are explored as solvent for CO_{2} electrochemical reduction. In addition, Methanol has been industrially used as a physical absorber of CO_{2} in the Rectisol method. Similarly to aqueous media system, p-Si, p-InP, p-GaAs, p-GaP and p-CdTe are explored for CO_{2} photoelectrochemical reduction. Among these, p-GaP has lowest overpotential, whereas, p-CdTe has moderate overpotential but high catalytic current density in DMF with 5% water mixture system. Main product of CO_{2} reduction in non-aqueous media is carbon monoxide. Competitive hydrogen generation is minimized in non-aqueous media. Proposed mechanism for CO_{2} reduction to CO in non-aqueous media involves single electron reduction of CO_{2} to CO_{2}^{●−} radical anion and adsorption of radical anion to surface followed by disproportionate reaction between unreduced CO_{2} and CO_{2}^{●−} radical anion to form CO_{3}^{2−} and CO.

== See also ==
- Artificial photosynthesis
- Electrochemical reduction of carbon dioxide
- Photochemical reduction of carbon dioxide
- Photoelectrolysis of water
- Photoelectrochemistry
