= Solar–hydrogen energy cycle =

Solar–hydrogen energy cycle is an energy cycle where a solar powered electrolyzer is used to convert water to hydrogen and oxygen. Hydrogen and oxygen produced thus are stored to be used by a fuel cell to produce electricity when no sunlight is available.

== Working ==
Photovoltaic panels convert sunlight to electricity. In this cycle, the excess electricity produced after consumption by devices connected to the system, is used to power an electrolyzer. The electrolyzer converts water into hydrogen and oxygen, which is stored. This hydrogen is used up by a fuel cell to produce electricity, which can power the devices when sunlight is unavailable. Solar Panels: Photovoltaic (PV) panels convert sunlight into electricity. This energy is utilized within the system or directed to an electrolyzer for further processing. Electrolysis: Excess electricity powers an electrolyzer, which splits water (H_{2}O) into hydrogen (H_{2}) and oxygen (O_{2}) through electrolysis. This step occurs continuously, allowing for the steady production of hydrogen. Hydrogen Storage: The produced hydrogen is stored in tanks or underground reservoirs to be used later when needed. Fuel Cell: When electricity demand rises or sunlight is unavailable, stored hydrogen is fed into a fuel cell. The fuel cell combines hydrogen and oxygen, generating electricity and producing only water vapor as a byproduct.

== Features ==
The Solar–Hydrogen energy cycle can be incorporated using organic thin film solar cells and microcrystalline silicon thin film solar cells This cycle can also be incorporated using photoelectrochemical solar cells. These solar have been incorporated since 1972 for hydrogen production and is capable of directly converting sunlight into chemical energy. Integration with Various Solar Technologies: The solar-hydrogen energy cycle can incorporate different photovoltaic technologies, including organic thin-film solar cells and microcrystalline silicon thin-film solar cells. Photoelectrochemical Cells: Another option for integration is photoelectrochemical (PEC) solar cells, which directly convert sunlight into chemical energy by splitting water into hydrogen. PEC cells have been under development since 1972. Alternative Fuels: Research explores the use of hydrogen iodide (HI) as an alternative to water for easier splitting, leveraging silicon photoelectrodes to decompose HI into hydrogen and iodine without requiring an external bias.

== Use of hydrogen iodide ==
An aqueous solution of hydrogen iodide has been proposed as an alternative to water as a fuel that can be used in this cycle. Splitting of hydrogen iodide is easier than splitting water as its Gibbs energy change for decomposition is lesser. Hence silicon photoelectrodes can decompose hydrogen iodide into hydrogen and iodine without any external bias.

== Advantages ==
- This cycle is pollution free as the only effluent from this cycle is pure water.

Clean Energy Source: The solar-hydrogen cycle is a pollution-free process, with water vapor being the only byproduct from the fuel cell. Energy Storage: This cycle enables the storage of excess solar energy as hydrogen, providing a reliable source of power even when sunlight is unavailable.

== See also ==
- Energy storage
- Photoelectrolysis of water
- Photocatalytic water splitting
- Power to gas
