= Energy cycle =

Energy cycles are based on the fact that in physics, energy is conserved and may in particular refer to:

- Solar–hydrogen energy cycle
- Lorenz energy cycle

In a wider sense energy cycle may refer to the following engineering fields:

- Energy recycling
- Energy recovery
