= Photoelectrolysis of water =

Photoelectrolysis of water, also known as photoelectrochemical water splitting, occurs in a photoelectrochemical cell when light is used as the energy source for the electrolysis of water, producing dihydrogen which can be used as a fuel. This process is one route to a "hydrogen economy", in which hydrogen fuel is produced efficiently and inexpensively from natural sources without using fossil fuels. In contrast, steam reforming usually or always uses a fossil fuel to obtain hydrogen. Photoelectrolysis is sometimes known colloquially as the hydrogen holy grail for its potential to yield a viable alternative to petroleum as a source of energy; such an energy source would supposedly come without the sociopolitically undesirable effects of extracting and using petroleum.

Some researchers have practiced photoelectrolysis by means of a nanoscale process. Nanoscale photoelectrolysis of water could someday reach greater efficiency than that of "traditional" photoelectrolysis. Semiconductors with bandgaps smaller than 1.7 eV would ostensibly be required for efficient nanoscale photoelectrolysis using light from the Sun.

Devices based on hydrogenase have also been investigated.

== See also ==
- Artificial photosynthesis
- Electrochemiluminescence
- Photoelectrochemical reduction of CO_{2}
- Photoelectrochemistry
- Electrolysis of water
- Photocatalytic water splitting
