= Giacomo Ciamician =

Italian chemist and politician (1857–1922)

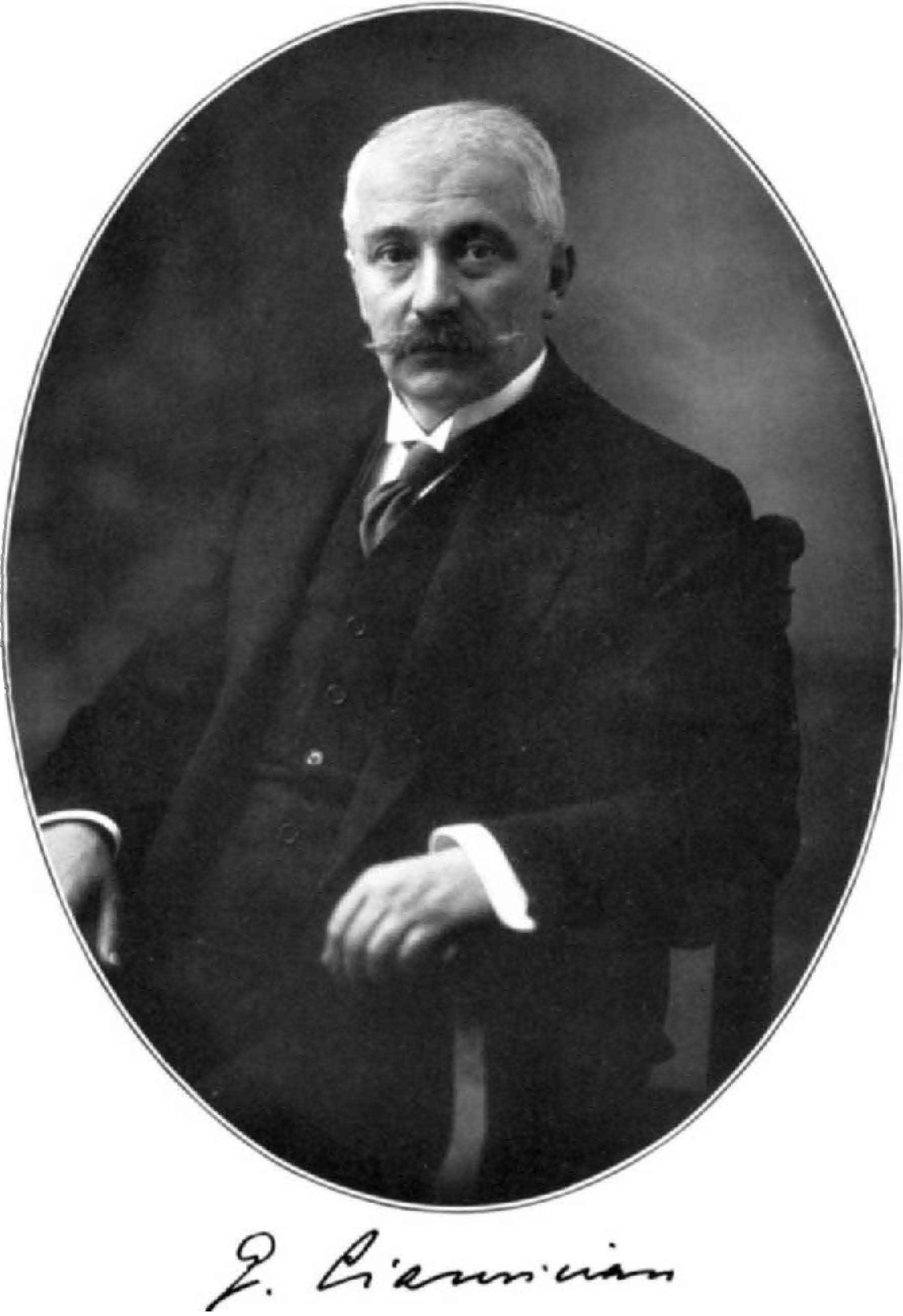
- Born: Giacomo Luigi Ciamician; 27 August 1857; Trieste, Austrian Empire
- Died: 2 January 1922 (aged 64); Bologna, Italy
- Education: University of Vienna; University of Giessen
- Known for: Photochemistry
- Parents: Giacomo Ciamician (father); Carolina Ghezzo (mother)
- Scientific career
- Workplaces: University of Padua; University of Bologna
- Doctoral advisor: Hugo Weidel
- Other academic advisors: Ludwig Barth zu Barthenau; Stanislao Cannizzaro
- Doctoral students: Angelo Angeli

Giacomo Luigi Ciamician (Italian pronunciation: [ˈdʒaːkomo luˈiːdʒi ˈtʃaːmitʃan]; 27 August 1857 – 2 January 1922) was an Italian chemist and senator. He was a pioneer in photochemistry and green chemistry, and the earliest to anticipate artificial photosynthesis.

== Education and career ==
Ciamician was born in Trieste, Austrian Empire to ethnic Armenian parents. His family had moved from Istanbul to Trieste in 1850.

Ciamician studied at University of Vienna and University of Giessen, where he received his PhD under Hugo Weidel in 1880. He then worked as an assistant for Stanislao Cannizzaro at the University of Rome, before moving to University of Padua as a lecturer in 1887. He became a professor at University of Bologna and spent the rest of his career there.

In 1910 he became the first man born in Trieste to be nominated Senator, in the XXIII Legislation of the Kingdom of Italy.

== Research ==
Ciamician was an early researcher in the area of photochemistry, where from 1900 to 1914 he published 40 notes, and nine memoirs. He received his Ph.D. from the University of Giessen. His first photochemistry experiment was published in 1886 and was titled "On the conversion of quinone into quinol.

In 1912 he presented a paper before the 8th International Congress on Applied Chemistry later also published in Science in which he described the world's need for an energy transition to renewable energy. Ciamician saw the possibility to use photochemical devices that utilize solar energy to produce fuels to power the human civilization and called for their development. They would not only make humanity independent from coal, but could also rebalance the economic gap between rich and poor countries. His vision makes him one early proponents of artificial photosynthesis:

On the arid lands there will spring up industrial colonies without smoke and without smokestacks; forests of glass tubes will extend over the plains and glass buildings will rise everywhere; inside of these will take place the photochemical processes that hitherto have been the guarded secret of the plants, but that will have been mastered by human industry which will know how to make them bear even more abundant fruit than nature, for nature is not in a hurry and mankind is. And if in a distant future the supply of coal becomes completely exhausted, civilization will not be checked by that, for life and civilization will continue as long as the sun shines!

== Honors and awards ==
Ciamician received the honorary Doctor of Laws (DLL) from the University of Glasgow in June 1901. University of Bologna's Department of Chemistry is named after Ciamician.

He was nominated for Nobel Prize in Chemistry nine times in 1905, 1907, 1908, 1911, 1912, 1914, 1916, 1919 and 1921.

== Selected publications ==
- Ciamician, G. L.; Dennstedt, M. (1881). "Ueber die Einwirkung des Chloroforms auf die Kaliumverbindung Pyrrols". Berichte der Deutschen Chemischen Gesellschaft. 14 (1): 1153–1163. doi:10.1002/cber.188101401240. ISSN 0365-9496.
- Ciamician, G.; Plancher, G. (1896). "Ueber die Einwirkung von Jodäthyl auf α-Methylindol (Methylketol)". Berichte der Deutschen Chemischen Gesellschaft. 29 (3): 2475–2482. doi:10.1002/cber.18960290318. ISSN 0365-9496.
- Ciamician, Giacomo; Silber, Paolo (1901). "Chemische Lichtwirkungen". Berichte der Deutschen Chemischen Gesellschaft. 34 (2): 2040–2046. doi:10.1002/cber.190103402118. ISSN 0365-9496.
- Ciamician, Giacomo (27 September 1912). "The Photochemistry of the Future". Science. 36 (926): 385–394. Bibcode:1912Sci....36..385C. doi:10.1126/science.36.926.385. ISSN 0036-8075. PMID 17836492.

== See also ==
- Ciamician-Dennstedt rearrangement
