= Photocatalytic water splitting =

Process for the dissociation of water into hydrogen and oxygen

Photocatalytic water splitting is a process that uses photocatalysis for the dissociation of water (H_{2}O) into hydrogen (H_{2}) and oxygen (O_{2}). The inputs are light energy (photons) and water. The process, still more hypothetical than practical, depends on catalyst(s). Photocatalytic water splitting is inspired by photosynthesis, which converts water and carbon dioxide into oxygen and carbohydrates. Water splitting using solar radiation has not been commercialized.

Photocatalytic water splitting is achieved by irradiation of an aqueous dispersion of particles of photocatalysts. They are unlike Photoelectrochemical cell. Hydrogen fuel production using water and light (photocatalytic water splitting), instead of petroleum, is an important renewable energy strategy.

== Concepts ==
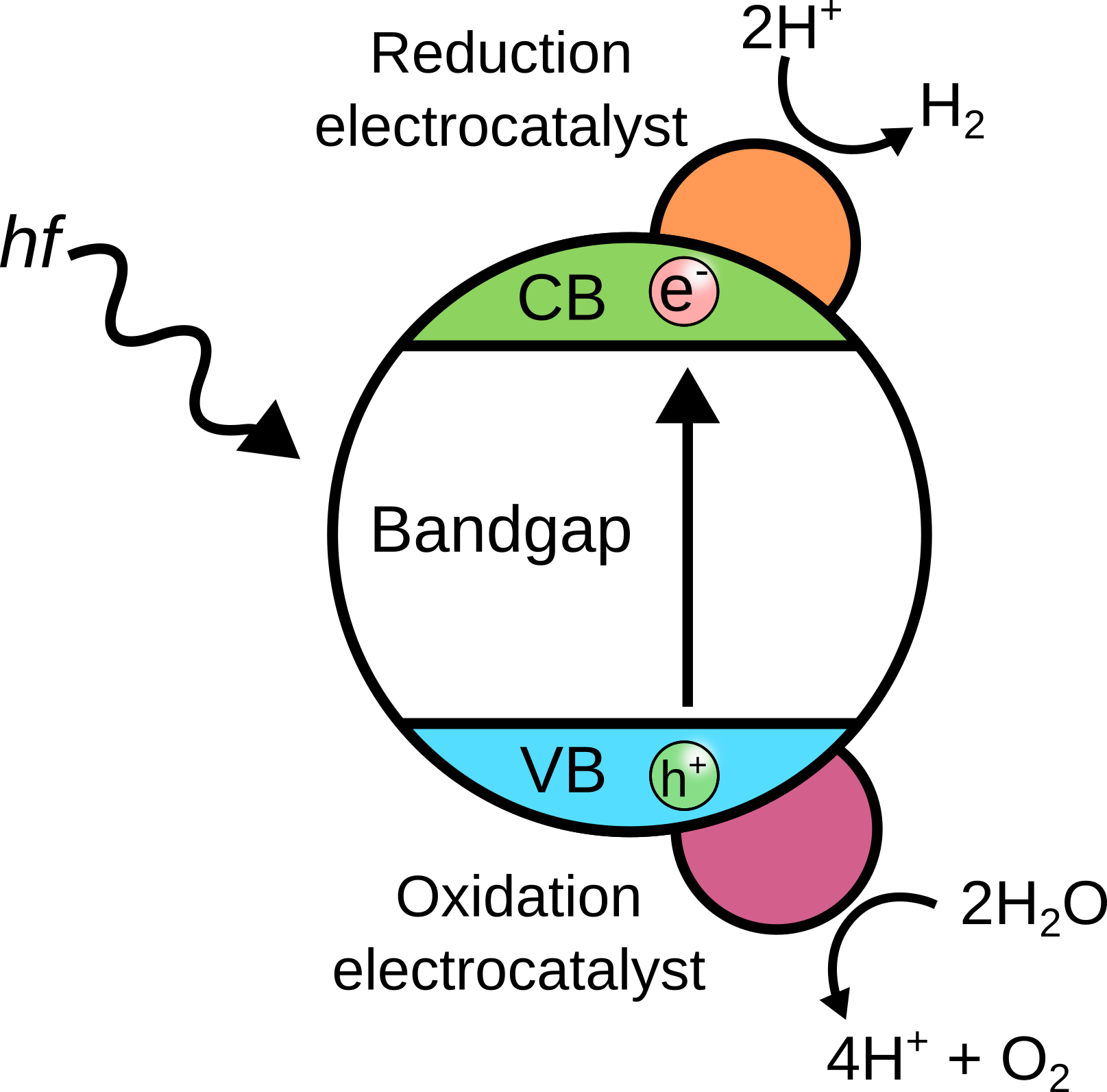
Water splitting is driven by the electron-hole pair generated by a photon. The bandgap is the energy difference between the conduction band minimum (CB) and the valence band maximum (VB). Electrocatalysts are added to reduce the overpotential of water splitting

Two mole of H_{2}O is split into 1 mol O_{2} and 2 mol H_{2} using light in the process shown below.

$\begin{array}{ll} \text{Light absorption: } & \mathrm{SC} + h\nu \ \ce{-> {e^{-}_{cb}} + h+_{vb}} \\ \text{Oxidation reaction: } & \ce{{2H2O} + 4h+_{vb} -> {O2} + 4H+}\\ \text{Reduction reaction: } & \ce{{2H+} + 2e^-_{cb} -> H2}\\ \text{Overall water splitting: } & \ce{2H2O -> {2H2} + O2} \end{array}$
- $h\nu\ (>\ 1.23~\mathrm{eV})$ : photon energy
- SC: semiconductor
- $\ce{e^{-}_{cb}}$: electron in conduction band
- $\ce{h+_{vb}}$: hole in valence band

A photon with an energy greater than 1.23 eV is needed to generate an electron–hole pairs, which react with water on the surface of the photocatalyst. The photocatalyst must have a bandgap large enough to split water; in practice, losses from material internal resistance and the overpotential of the water splitting reaction increase the required bandgap energy to 1.6–2.4 eV to drive water splitting.

The process of water-splitting is a highly endothermic process (ΔH > 0). Water splitting occurs naturally in photosynthesis when the energy of four photons is absorbed and converted into chemical energy through a complex biochemical pathway (Dolai's or Kok's S-state diagrams).

O–H bond homolysis in water requires energy of 6.5–6.9 eV (UV photon). Infrared light has sufficient energy to mediate water splitting because it technically has enough energy for the net reaction. However, it does not have enough energy to mediate the elementary reactions leading to the various intermediates involved in water splitting (this is why there is still water on Earth). Nature overcomes this challenge by absorbing four visible photons. In the laboratory, this challenge is typically overcome by coupling the hydrogen production reaction with a sacrificial reductant other than water.

Materials used in photocatalytic water splitting fulfill the band requirements and typically have dopants and/or co-catalysts added to optimize their performance. A sample semiconductor with the proper band structure is titanium dioxide (TiO_{2}) and is typically used with a co-catalyst such as platinum (Pt) to increase the rate of H_{2} production. A major problem in photocatalytic water splitting is photocatalyst decomposition and corrosion.

== Method of evaluation ==
Photocatalysts must conform to several key principles in order to be considered effective at water splitting. A key principle is that H_{2} and O_{2} evolution should occur in a stoichiometric 2:1 ratio; significant deviation could be due to a flaw in the experimental setup and/or a side reaction, neither of which indicate a reliable photocatalyst for water splitting. The prime measure of photocatalyst effectiveness is quantum yield (QY), which is:

QY (%) = (Photochemical reaction rate) / (Photon absorption rate) × 100%

To assist in comparison, the rate of gas evolution can also be used. A photocatalyst that has a high quantum yield and gives a high rate of gas evolution is a better catalyst.

The other important factor for a photocatalyst is the range of light that is effective for operation. For example, a photocatalyst is more desirable to use visible photons than UV photons.

== Photocatalysts ==
The efficiency of solar-to-hydrogen (STH) of photocatalytic water splitting, however, has remained very low.

=== Gallium-indium nitride ===
A STH efficiency of 9.2% indium.

=== NaTaO_{3}:La ===
NaTaO_{3}:La yielded the highest water splitting rate of photocatalysts without using sacrificial reagents. This ultraviolet-based photocatalyst was reported to show water splitting rates of 9.7 mmol/h and a quantum yield of 56%. The nanostep structure of the material promotes water splitting as edges functioned as H_{2} production sites and the grooves functioned as O_{2} production sites. Addition of NiO particles as co-catalysts assisted in H_{2} production; this step used an impregnation method with an aqueous solution of Ni(NO_{3})_{2}•6H_{2}O and evaporated the solution in the presence of the photocatalyst. NaTaO_{3} has a conduction band higher than that of NiO, so photo-generated electrons are more easily transferred to the conduction band of NiO for H_{2} evolution.

=== K_{3}Ta_{3}B_{2}O_{12} ===
K_{3}Ta_{3}B_{2}O_{12} is another catalyst solely activated by UV and above light. It does not have the performance or quantum yield of NaTaO_{3}:La. However, it can split water without the assistance of co-catalysts and gives a quantum yield of 6.5%, along with a water splitting rate of 1.21 mmol/h. This ability is due to the pillared structure of the photocatalyst, which involves TaO_{6} pillars connected by BO_{3} triangle units. Loading with NiO did not assist the photocatalyst due to the highly active H_{2} evolution sites.

=== (Ga_{.82}Zn_{.18})(N_{.82}O_{.18}) ===
(Ga_{.82}Zn_{.18})(N_{.82}O_{.18}) had the highest quantum yield in visible light for visible light-based photocatalysts that do not utilize sacrificial reagents as of October 2008. The photocatalyst featured a quantum yield of 5.9% and a water splitting rate of 0.4 mmol/h. Tuning the catalyst was done by increasing calcination temperatures for the final step in synthesizing the catalyst. Temperatures up to 600 °C helped to reduce the number of defects, while temperatures above 700 °C destroyed the local structure around zinc atoms and were thus undesirable. The treatment ultimately reduced the amount of surface Zn and O defects, which normally function as recombination sites, thus limiting photocatalytic activity. The catalyst was then loaded with Rh_{2-y}Cr_{y}O_{3} at a rate of 2.5 wt% Rh and 2 wt% Cr for better performance.

=== Molecular catalysts ===
Proton reduction catalysts based on earth-abundant elements carry out one side of the water-splitting half-reaction.

A mole of octahedral nickel(II) complex, [Ni(bztpen)]^{2+} (bztpen = N-benzyl-N,N',N'-tris(pyridine-2-ylmethyl)ethylenediamine) produced 308,000 moles of hydrogen over 60 hours of electrolysis with an applied potential of -1.25 V vs. standard hydrogen electrode.

Ru(II) with three 2,2'-bipyridine ligands is a common compound for photosensitization used for photocatalytic oxidative transformations like water splitting. However, the bipyridine degrades due to the strongly oxidative conditions which causes the concentration of Ru(bpy)32+ to diminish. Measurements of the degradation is difficult with UV-Vis spectroscopy but MALDI MS can be used instead.

Cobalt-based photocatalysts have been reported, including tris(bipyridine) cobalt(II), compounds of cobalt ligated to certain cyclic polyamines, and some cobaloximes.

=== Bismuth vanadate ===
Bismuth vanadate is a visible-light-driven photocatalyst with a bandgap of 2.4 eV. BV have demonstrated efficiencies of 5.2% for flat thin films and 8.2% for core-shell WO_{3}@BiVO_{4} nanorods with thin absorbers.

=== Bismuth oxides ===
Bismuth oxides are characterized by visible light absorption properties, just like vanadates.

=== Tungsten diselenide (WSe_{2}) ===
Tungsten diselenide has photocatalytic properties that might be a key to more efficient electrolysis.

=== III-V semiconductor systems ===
Systems based on III-V semiconductors, such as InGaP, enable solar-to-hydrogen efficiencies of up to 14%. Challenges include long-term stability and cost.

=== 2D semiconductor systems ===
2-dimensional semiconductors such as MoS_{2} are actively researched as potential photocatalysts.

=== Aluminum‐based metal-organic frameworks ===
An aluminum‐based metal-organic framework made from 2‐aminoterephthalate can be modified by incorporating Ni^{2+} cations into the pores through coordination with the amino groups.

=== Porous organic polymers ===
Organic semiconductor photocatalysts, in particular porous organic polymers (POPs), attracted attention due to their low cost, low toxicity, and tunable light absorption vs inorganic counterparts. They display high porosity, low density, diverse composition, facile functionalization, high chemical/thermal stability, as well as high surface areas. Efficient conversion of hydrophobic polymers into hydrophilic polymer nano-dots (Pdots) increased polymer-water interfacial contact, which significantly improved performance.

=== Ansa-Titanocene(III/IV) Triflate Complexes ===
Beweries, et al., developed a light-driven "closed cycle of water splitting using ansa-titanocene(III/IV) triflate complexes".

=== Indium gallium nitride ===
An Indium gallium nitride (In_{x}Ga_{1-x}N) photocatalyst achieved a solar-to-hydrogen efficiency of 9.2% from pure water and concentrated sunlight. The effiency is due to the synergistic effects of promoting hydrogen–oxygen evolution and inhibiting recombination by operating at an optimal reaction temperature (~70 degrees C), powered by harvesting previously wasted infrared light. An STH efficiency of about 7% was realized from tap water and seawater and efficiency of 6.2% in a larger-scale system with a solar light capacity of 257 watts.

=== Sacrificial reagents ===
==== Cd_{1-x}Zn_{x}S ====
Solid solutions Cd_{1-x}Zn_{x}S with different Zn concentration (0.2 < x < 0.35) have been investigated in the production of hydrogen from aqueous solutions containing $\ce{SO3^2-}/\ce{S^2-}$ as sacrificial reagents under visible light. Textural, structural and surface catalyst properties were determined by N_{2} adsorption isotherms, UV–vis spectroscopy, SEM and XRD and related to the activity results in hydrogen production from water splitting under visible light. It was reported that the crystallinity and energy band structure of the Cd_{1-x}Zn_{x}S solid solutions depend on their Zn atomic concentration. The hydrogen production rate increased gradually as Zn concentration on photocatalysts increased from 0.2 to 0.3. The subsequent increase in the Zn fraction up to 0.35 reduced production. Variation in photoactivity was analyzed for changes in crystallinity, level of the conduction band and light absorption ability of Cd_{1-x}Zn_{x}S solid solutions derived from their Zn atomic concentration.

== See also ==
- Artificial photosynthesis
- High-temperature electrolysis
- Photochemical reduction of carbon dioxide
- Electrolysis of water
- Photoelectrolysis of water
