= Electrochemical reduction of carbon dioxide =

The electrochemical reduction of carbon dioxide, also known as CO_{2}RR, is a process that converts carbon dioxide (CO_{2}) to more reduced chemical species using electrical energy. CO_{2}RR can produce diverse compounds including formate, carbon monoxide, methane, ethylene, and ethanol. Provided the process is run using renewable energy and the CO_{2} is sourced from flue gas or direct air capture, it could be an efficient form of carbon capture and utilization.

CO_{2}RR has recently seen significant research and commercial interest, due to its potential to reduce greenhouse gas emissions while creating useful products from waste CO_{2}. The main challenges are the cost of electricity, competition from established petrochemical-based production methods of these products, and the need to purify the CO_{2} before use.

The electrochemical reduction of CO_{2} first demonstrated in the 19th century, when carbon dioxide was reduced to carbon monoxide using a zinc cathode. The field saw a surge of interest in the 1980s following the oil embargoes of the 1970s. As of 2021, pilot and demonstration scale carbon dioxide electrochemical reduction is being developed by several companies, including Siemens, Dioxide Materials, Twelve, GIGKarasek, and OCOchem. The techno-economic analysis has been recently conducted to assess the key technical gaps and commercial potentials of the carbon dioxide electrolysis technology at near ambient conditions.

CO_{2}RR is performed using an electrolyzer in which CO_{2} is reduced at the cathode while water is oxidized to oxygen gas (O_{2}) at the anode. The anode typically also contains a catalyst, the choice of which heavily influences the product: for example, gold and silver tend to produce carbon monoxide, while copper often produces multicarbon compounds like ethylene or ethanol. Alternative electrolyzer setups have also been developed to reduce other forms of CO_{2}, including carbonates or bicarbonates sourced from CO_{2}, carbamates sourced from flue gas effluents using alkali or amine-based absorbents like MEA or DEA. While the techno-economics of these systems are not yet feasible, they provide a near net carbon neutral pathway to produce commodity chemicals like ethylene at industrially relevant scales.

== History ==
In 1870, French chemist Ernest Pierre Royer first reported the electrochemical reduction of "gaseous carbonic acid" (carbon dioxide) to formic acid using a zinc cathode. In 1904, German chemists Alfred Coehn and Stefan Jahn studied the process in more detail, testing a range of cathodes and pH ranges, noting a strong preference for zinc amalgam cathodes and non-acidic electrolytes. These conditions quickly became the standard for research in the nascent field. Experiments in the 1940s and 1950s, especially by Pierre Van Rysselberghe, studied the reaction mechanism, notably proving that carbon dioxide (rather than the carbonate or bicarbonate ions) is the electroactive species.

These foundational studies primarily reported the reduction of CO_{2} to formate or formic acid. The generation of other products began to be studied in detail in the 1980s, when Yoshio Hori and his co-workers reported the conditions to produce hydrocarbons and carbon monoxide.

== In industry ==
While some chemicals are made industrially from CO_{2}, including urea, salicylic acid, methanol, and certain inorganic and organic carbonates, these are standard chemical, rather than electrochemical, processes. However, since the early 2020s, a number of companies have invested in the development of commercial-scale processes for the electrochemical reduction of carbon dioxide. Twelve, a California-based start-up, aims to reduce carbon dioxide to carbon monoxide, which can in turn be converted to hydrocarbons via the Fischer–Tropsch process. Dioxycle, a French-American start-up, produces ethylene, a widely-used raw material a wide range of chemicals and plastics.

In the laboratory, carbon dioxide is sometimes used to prepare carboxylic acids in a process known as carboxylation. An electrochemical CO_{2} electrolyzer that operates at room temperature at an industrial scale cell size (15,000cm2) was announced by OCOchem in April 2024 as part of an R&D contract issued by the US Army. The CO_{2} electrolyzer was reported as the largest in the world with a cathode surface area of 15,000cm2, 650% larger than nearest alternative, and achieving a sustained 85% Faradaic efficiency. Elevated temperature solid oxide electrolyzer cells (SOECs) for CO_{2} reduction to CO are commercially available. For example, Haldor Topsoe offers SOECs for CO_{2} reduction with a reported 6–8 kWh per Nm^{3} (Note: Normal Cubic Meter - the quantity of gas that occupies one cubic meter at standard temperature and pressure.) CO produced and purity up to 99.999% CO.

== Electrocatalysis ==
The electrochemical reduction of carbon dioxide to various products is usually described as:

Reaction	Reduction potential E^{o} (V) at pH = 7 vs SHE
CO_{2} + 2 H^{+} + 2 e^{−} → CO + H_{2}O	−0.52
CO_{2} + 2 H^{+} + 2 e^{−} → HCOOH	−0.61
CO_{2} + 8 H^{+} + 8 e^{−} → CH_{4} + 2 H_{2}O	−0.24
2 CO_{2} + 12 H^{+} + 12 e^{−} → C_{2}H_{4} + 4 H_{2}O	−0.34

The redox potentials for these reactions are similar to that for hydrogen evolution in aqueous electrolytes, thus electrochemical reduction of CO_{2} is usually competitive with hydrogen evolution reaction.

Electrochemical methods have gained significant attention:

1. at ambient pressure and room temperature;
2. in connection with renewable energy sources (see also solar fuel)
3. competitive controllability, modularity and scale-up are relatively simple.

The electrochemical reduction or electrocatalytic conversion of CO_{2} can produce value-added chemicals such methane, ethylene, ethanol, etc., and the products are mainly dependent on the selected catalysts and operating potentials (applying reduction voltage). A variety of homogeneous and heterogeneous catalysts have been evaluated.

Many such processes are assumed to operate via the intermediacy of metal carbon dioxide complexes. Many processes suffer from high overpotential, low current efficiency, low selectivity, slow kinetics, and/or poor catalyst stability.

The composition of the electrolyte can be decisive. Gas-diffusion electrodes are beneficial.

== Catalysts ==
Catalysts can be grouped by their primary products. Several metal are unfit for CO_{2}RR because they promote to perform hydrogen evolution instead. Electrocatalysts selective for one particular organic compound include tin or bismuth for formate and silver or gold for carbon monoxide. Copper produces multiple reduced products such as methane, ethylene or ethanol, while methanol, propanol and 1-butanol have also been produced in minute quantities.

Three common products are carbon monoxide, formate, or higher order carbon products (two or more carbons).

=== Carbon monoxide-producing ===
Carbon monoxide can be produced from CO_{2}RR over various precious metal catalysts. Gold is known to be the most active, however Ag is also highly active. It is known that the stepped facets of both Au and Ag crystals (e.g. 110 and 211) are over an order of magnitude more active than the planar facets (e.g. 111 and 100). Single site catalysts, usually based on Ni in a graphitic lattice have also shown to be highly selective towards carbon monoxide.

Mechanistically, catalysts that convert CO_{2}RR to carbon monoxide do not bind strongly to carbon monoxide allowing it to escape from the catalyst. The rate limiting step for CO_{2}RR to carbon monoxide is the first electron transfer step and this is heavily influenced by the electric field.

=== Formate/formic acid-producing ===
Formic acid is produced as a primary product from CO_{2}RR over diverse catalysts.

Catalysts that promote formic acid production from CO_{2} operate by strongly binding to both oxygen atoms of CO_{2}, allowing protons to attack the central carbon. After attacking the central carbon, one proton attaching to an oxygen results in the creation of formate. Indium catalysts promote formate production because the indium-oxygen binding energy is stronger than the indium-carbon binding energy. This promotes the production of formate instead of carbon monoxide.

=== C_{>1}-producing catalysts ===
Copper electrocatalysts produce multicarbon compounds from CO_{2}. These include C_{2} products (ethylene, ethanol, acetate, etc.) and even C_{3} products (propanol, acetone, etc.) These products are more valuable than C1 products, but the current efficiencies are low.

== See also ==
- Electromethanogenesis
- Biobattery
- Electrofuel
- Lemon battery
- Photoelectrochemical reduction of carbon dioxide
- Photochemical reduction of carbon dioxide
- Electrolysis of water
- Electrochemical energy conversion
- Bioelectrochemical reactor
