= Artificial photosynthesis =

Artificial process that uses sunlight energy to drive chemical synthesis

Artificial photosynthesis is a chemical process that biomimics the natural process of photosynthesis. The term artificial photosynthesis is used loosely, referring to any scheme for capturing and then storing energy from sunlight by producing a fuel, specifically a solar fuel. An advantage of artificial photosynthesis would be that the solar energy could be converted and stored. By contrast, using photovoltaic cells, sunlight is converted into electricity and then converted again into chemical energy for storage, with some necessary losses of energy associated with the second conversion. The byproducts of these reactions are environmentally friendly. Artificially photosynthesized fuel would be a carbon-neutral source of energy, but it has never been demonstrated in any practical sense. The economics of artificial photosynthesis are noncompetitive.

== Overview ==
Numerous schemes have been described as artificial photosynthesis.

- Photocatalytic water splitting, the conversion of water into hydrogen and oxygen:

2 H_{2}O → 2 H_{2} + O_{2}

This scheme is the simplest form of artificial photosynthesis conceptually, but has not been demonstrated in any practicable way.

- Light-driven carbon dioxide reduction, the conversion of water, carbon dioxide into carbon monoxide or organic compounds and oxygen. In the conceptually simplest manifestation, this process gives CO:

2 CO_{2} → 2 CO + O_{2}

Related processes give formic acid (HCO_{2}H):

2 H_{2}O + 2 CO_{2} → 2 HCO_{2}H + O_{2}

Variations might produce formaldehyde or, equivalently, carbohydrates:

H_{2}O + CO_{2} → H_{2}CO + O_{2}

These processes replicate natural carbon fixation.

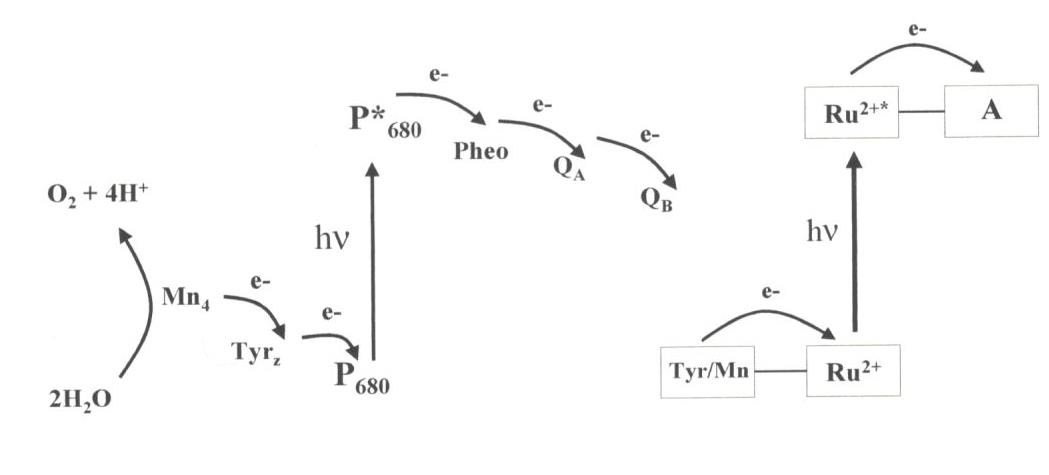
Natural (left) versus artificial photosynthesis (right)

Because of the socio-economic implications, artificial photosynthesis is topical, despite the many challenges. Ideally the only inputs to produce such solar fuels would be water, carbon dioxide, and sunlight. The only by-product would be oxygen, by using direct processes.

== History ==
Artificial photosynthesis was first anticipated by the Italian chemist Giacomo Ciamician during 1912. In a lecture that was later published in Science, he proposed a switch from the use of fossil fuels to radiant energy provided by the sun and captured by technical photochemistry devices. In this switch, he saw a possibility to lessen the difference between the rich north of Europe and poor south and ventured a guess that this switch from coal to solar energy would "not be harmful to the progress and to human happiness".

During the late 1960s, Akira Fujishima discovered the photocatalytic properties of titanium dioxide, the so-called Honda-Fujishima effect, which could be used for hydrolysis.

Visible light water splitting with a one piece multijunction semiconductor device (vs. UV light with titanium dioxide semiconductors) was first demonstrated and patented by William Ayers at Energy Conversion Devices during 1983. This group demonstrated water photolysis into hydrogen and oxygen, now referred to as an "artificial leaf" with a low cost, thin film amorphous silicon multijunction sheet immersed directly in water. Hydrogen evolved on the front amorphous silicon surface decorated with various catalysts while oxygen evolved from the back side metal substrate which also eliminated the hazard of mixed hydrogen/oxygen gas evolution. A polymer membrane above the immersed device provided a path for proton transport. The higher photovoltage available from the multijunction thin film device with visible light was a major advance over previous photolysis attempts with UV or other single junction semiconductor photoelectrodes. The group's patent also lists several other semiconductor multijunction compositions in addition to amorphous silicon.

Since the 1990s, much has been learned about catalysts hydrogen evolution reaction and oxygen evolution reaction. Unfortunately, no practical system has been demonstrated despite intense efforts.

== Catalysis ==
=== Catalytic triad ===
A triad assembly, with a photosensitizer (P) linked in tandem to a water oxidation catalyst (D) and a hydrogen evolving catalyst (A). Electrons flow from D to A when catalysis occurs.

Some concepts for artificial photosynthesis consist of distinct components, which are inspired by natural photosynthesis:

- Light-harvesting complexes in bacteria and plants capture photons and transduce them into electrons, injecting them into the photosynthetic chain.
- Proton-coupled electron transfer along several cofactors of the photosynthetic chain, causing local, spatial charge separation.
- Redox catalysis, which uses the aforementioned transferred electrons to oxidize water to dioxygen and protons; these protons can in some species be utilized for dihydrogen production.

These processes could be replicated by a triad assembly, which could oxidize water at one catalyst, reduce protons at another, and have a photosensitizer molecule to power the whole system

=== Catalysts ===
Some catalysts for solar fuel cells are envisioned to produce hydrogen.

1) A homogeneous system is one such that catalysts are not compartmentalized, that is, components are present in the same compartment. This means that hydrogen and oxygen are produced in the same location. This can be a drawback, since they compose an explosive mixture, demanding gas product separation. Also, all components must be active in approximately the same conditions (e.g., pH). 2) A heterogeneous system has two separate electrodes, an anode and a cathode, making possible the separation of oxygen and hydrogen production. Furthermore, different components do not necessarily need to work in the same conditions. However, the increased complexity of these systems makes them harder to develop and more expensive.

=== Selected catalysts ===
Many catalysts have been evaluated for both the O_{2}-evolution and the reductive sides of the process. Those listed below, which includes both oxidizer and reducers, are not practical, but illustrative:

- Cd_{1-x}Zn_{x}S photocatalysts. Cd_{1-x}Zn_{x}S solid solution catalyze hydrogen production from water splitting under sunlight irradiation.
- Nitrogen-doped and cadmium selenide quantum dots-sensitized titanium dioxide nanoparticles and nanowires, also yielded photoproduced hydrogen.
- Cobalt phosphate.
- Inexpensive iron carbonyl complexes catalyze hydrogen evolution. Gold electrode covered with layers of indium phosphide to which iron carbonyl compounds to achieve photoelectrochemical hydrogen production.
- Bismuth vanadate

Similar to natural photosynthesis, such artificial leaves can use a tandem of light absorbers for overall water splitting or CO_{2} reduction. These integrated systems can be assembled on lightweight, flexible substrates, resulting in floating devices resembling lotus leaves.

- Metal-organic framework (MOF)-based materials have been investigated for water oxidation. The stability and tunability of this system is projected to be highly beneficial for future development.

=== Catalyst stability ===
Catalysts for artificial photosynthesis are expected to effect turn over numbers in the millions. Catalysts often corrode in water, especially when irradiated. Thus, they may be less stable than photovoltaics. Hydrogen oxidation catalysts are very sensitive to oxygen, being inactivated or degraded in its presence; also, photodamage may occur over time.

== Research centers ==
Research centers were established across the globe, including Sweden, U.S., with the aim of finding a cost-effective method to produce fuels using only sunlight, water, and carbon-dioxide as inputs. Japan, This was confirmed with the establishment of the KAITEKI Institute later that year, with carbon dioxide reduction through artificial photosynthesis as one of the main goals. and Australia.

== Various components ==
=== Hydrogen catalysts ===
Hydrogen is the simplest solar fuel. Its formation involves only the transference of two electrons to two protons:

2 e^{−} + 2 H^{+} → H_{2}

The hydrogenase enzymes effect this conversion

Dirhodium photocatalyst and cobalt catalysts.

=== Water-oxidizing catalysts ===
Water oxidation is a more complex chemical reaction than proton reduction. In nature, the oxygen-evolving complex performs this reaction by accumulating reducing equivalents (electrons) in a manganese-calcium cluster within photosystem II (PS II), then delivering them to water molecules, with the resulting production of molecular oxygen and protons:

2 H_{2}O → O_{2} + 4 H^{+} + 4e^{−}

Without a catalyst (natural or artificial), this reaction is very endothermic, requiring high temperatures (at least 2500 K).

The exact structure of the oxygen-evolving complex has been hard to determine experimentally. As of 2011, the most detailed model was from a 1.9 Å resolution crystal structure of photosystem II. The complex is a cluster containing four manganese and one calcium ions, but the exact location and mechanism of water oxidation within the cluster is unknown. Nevertheless, bio-inspired manganese and manganese-calcium complexes have been synthesized, such as [Mn_{4}O_{4}] cubane-type clusters, some with catalytic activity.

Some ruthenium complexes, such as the dinuclear μ-oxo-bridged "blue dimer" (the first of its kind to be synthesized), are capable of light-driven water oxidation, thanks to being able to form high valence states. In this case, the ruthenium complex acts as both photosensitizer and catalyst. This complexes and other molecular catalysts still attract researchers in the field, having different advantages such as clear structure, active site, and easy to study mechanism. One of the main challenges to overcome is their short-term stability and their effective heterogenization for applications in artificial photosynthesis devices.

Many metal oxides have been found to have water oxidation catalytic activity, including ruthenium(IV) oxide (RuO_{2}), iridium(IV) oxide (IrO_{2}), cobalt oxides (including nickel-doped Co_{3}O_{4}), manganese oxide (including layered MnO_{2} (birnessite), Mn_{2}O_{3}), and a mix of Mn_{2}O_{3} with CaMn_{2}O_{4}. Oxides are easier to obtain than molecular catalysts, especially those from relatively abundant transition metals (cobalt and manganese), but suffer from low turnover frequency and slow electron transfer properties, and their mechanism of action is hard to decipher and, therefore, to adjust.

=== Photosensitizers ===
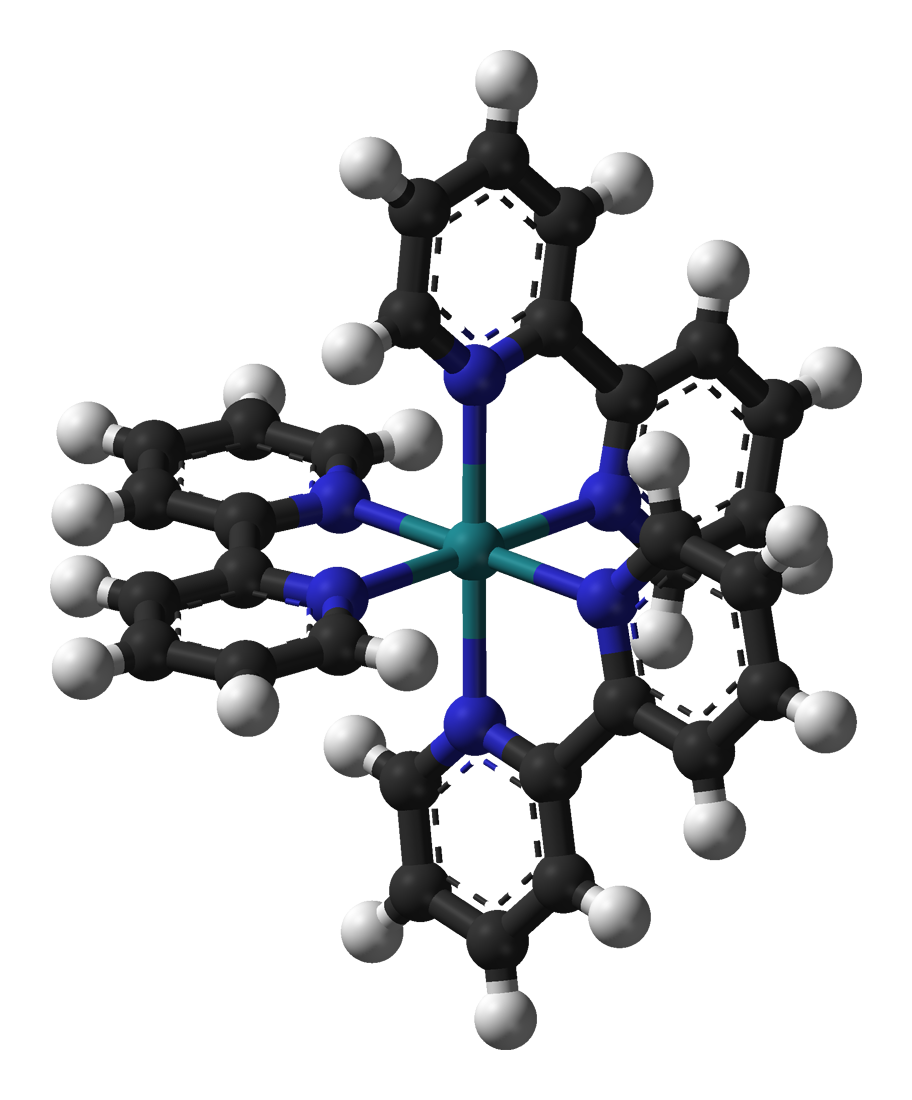
Structure of [Ru(bipy)_{3}]^{2+}, a broadly used photosensitizer.

Nature uses pigments, mainly chlorophylls, to absorb a broad part of the visible spectrum. Artificial systems can use either one type of pigment with a broad absorption range or combine several pigments for the same purpose.

Ruthenium polypyridine complexes, in particular tris(bipyridine)ruthenium(II) and its derivatives, have been extensively used in hydrogen photoproduction due to their efficient visible light absorption and long-lived consequent metal-to-ligand charge transfer excited state, which makes the complexes strong reducing agents. Other noble metal-containing complexes used include ones with platinum, rhodium and iridium.

Metal-free organic complexes have also been successfully employed as photosensitizers. Examples include eosin Y and rose bengal. Pyrrole rings such as porphyrins have also been used in coating nanomaterials or semiconductors for both homogeneous and heterogeneous catalysis.

As part of current research efforts artificial photonic antenna systems are being studied to determine efficient and sustainable ways to collect light for artificial photosynthesis. Gion Calzaferri (2009) describes one such antenna that uses zeolite L as a host for organic dyes, to mimic plant's light collecting systems. The antenna is fabricated by inserting dye molecules into the channels of zeolite L. The insertion process, which takes place under vacuum and at high temperature conditions, is made possible by the cooperative vibrational motion of the zeolite framework and of the dye molecules. The resulting material may be interfaced to an external device via a stopcock intermediate.

=== Carbon dioxide reduction catalysts ===
In nature, carbon fixation is done by green plants using the enzyme RuBisCO as a part of the Calvin cycle. RuBisCO is a rather slow catalyst compared to the vast majority of other enzymes, incorporating only a few molecules of carbon dioxide into ribulose-1,5-bisphosphate per minute, but does so at atmospheric pressure and in mild, biological conditions. The resulting product is further reduced and eventually used in the synthesis of glucose, which in turn is a precursor to more complex carbohydrates, such as cellulose and starch. The process consumes energy in the form of ATP and NADPH.

Artificial CO_{2} reduction for fuel production aims mostly at producing reduced carbon compounds from atmospheric CO_{2}. Some transition metal polyphosphine complexes have been developed for this end; however, they usually require previous concentration of CO_{2} before use, and carriers (molecules that would fixate CO_{2}) that are both stable in aerobic conditions and able to concentrate CO_{2} at atmospheric concentrations haven't been yet developed. The simplest product from CO_{2} reduction is carbon monoxide (CO), but for fuel development, further reduction is needed (for example, to multi-carbon products), and a key step also needing further development is the transfer of hydride anions to CO.

=== Photobiological production of fuels ===
Another area of research within artificial photosynthesis is the selection and manipulation of photosynthetic microorganisms, namely green microalgae and cyanobacteria, for the production of solar fuels. Many strains produce hydrogen naturally. Algae biofuels such as butanol and methanol have been produced at various scales. This method has benefited from the development of synthetic biology, Diverse biofuels have been developed, e.g., acetic acid from carbon dioxide using "cyborg bacteria".

Some solar cells are capable of splitting water into oxygen and hydrogen, approximately ten times more efficient than natural photosynthesis. Sun Catalytix, the startup based on the artificial leaf, stated that it will not be scaling up the prototype as the device offers few savings over other ways to make hydrogen from sunlight.

Some photoautotrophic microorganisms can, under certain conditions, produce hydrogen. Nitrogen-fixing microorganisms, such as filamentous cyanobacteria, possess the enzyme nitrogenase, responsible for conversion of atmospheric N_{2} into ammonia; molecular hydrogen is a byproduct of this reaction, and is many times not released by the microorganism, but rather taken up by a hydrogen-oxidizing (uptake) hydrogenase. One way of forcing these organisms to produce hydrogen is then to annihilate uptake hydrogenase activity. This has been done on a strain of Nostoc punctiforme: one of the structural genes of the NiFe uptake hydrogenase was inactivated by insertional mutagenesis, and the mutant strain showed hydrogen evolution under illumination.

Many of these photoautotrophs also have bidirectional hydrogenases, which can produce hydrogen under certain conditions. However, other energy-demanding metabolic pathways can compete with the necessary electrons for proton reduction, decreasing the efficiency of the overall process; also, these hydrogenases are very sensitive to oxygen.

Several carbon-based biofuels have also been produced using cyanobacteria, such as 1-butanol.

Synthetic biology techniques are predicted to be useful for this topic. Microbiological and enzymatic engineering have the potential of improving enzyme efficiency and robustness, as well as constructing new biofuel-producing metabolic pathways in photoautotrophs that previously lack them, or improving on the existing ones. Another topic being developed is the optimization of photobioreactors for commercial application.

=== Food production ===
Researchers have achieved controlled growth of diverse foods in the dark via solar energy and electrocatalysis-based artificial photosynthesis. It may become a way to increase energy efficiency of food production and reduce its environmental impacts. However, it is unclear if food production mechanisms based on the experimental process are viable and can be scaled.

== Some advantages, disadvantages, and efficiency ==
A concern usually addressed in catalyst design is efficiency, in particular how much of the incident light can be used in a system in practice. This is comparable with photosynthetic efficiency, where light-to-chemical-energy conversion is measured. Photosynthetic organisms are able to collect about 50% of incident solar radiation, however the theoretical limit of photosynthetic efficiency is 4.6 and 6.0% for C3 and C4 plants respectively. In reality, the efficiency of photosynthesis is much lower and is usually below 1%, with some exceptions such as sugarcane in tropical climate. In contrast, the highest reported efficiency for artificial photosynthesis lab prototypes is 22.4%. However, plants are efficient in using CO_{2} at atmospheric concentrations, something that artificial catalysts still cannot perform.

== See also ==
- Bacteriorhodopsin
- ATP synthase
- Photoelectrochemistry
- AlgaePARC
- Carbon footprint
- Fuel cell
- Hydrogen economy
- List of emerging technologies
- Metabolic engineering
- Photosensitizer
- CityTrees
- Liquid3
- Solar reforming
