= Hydrogen evolution reaction =

Chemical reaction

Hydrogen evolution reaction (HER) is a chemical reaction that yields H_{2}. The conversion of protons to H_{2} requires reducing equivalents and usually a catalyst. In nature, HER is catalyzed by hydrogenase enzymes which rely on iron- and nickel-based catalysts. Commercial electrolyzers typically employ supported nickel-based catalysts.

== HER in electrolysis ==
HER is a key reaction which occurs in the electrolysis of water for the production of hydrogen for both industrial energy applications, as well as small-scale laboratory research. Due to the abundance of water on Earth, hydrogen production poses a potentially scalable process for fuel generation. This is an alternative to steam methane reforming for hydrogen production, which has significant greenhouse gas emissions, and as such scientists are looking to improve and scale up electrolysis processes that have fewer emissions.

=== Electrolysis mechanism ===
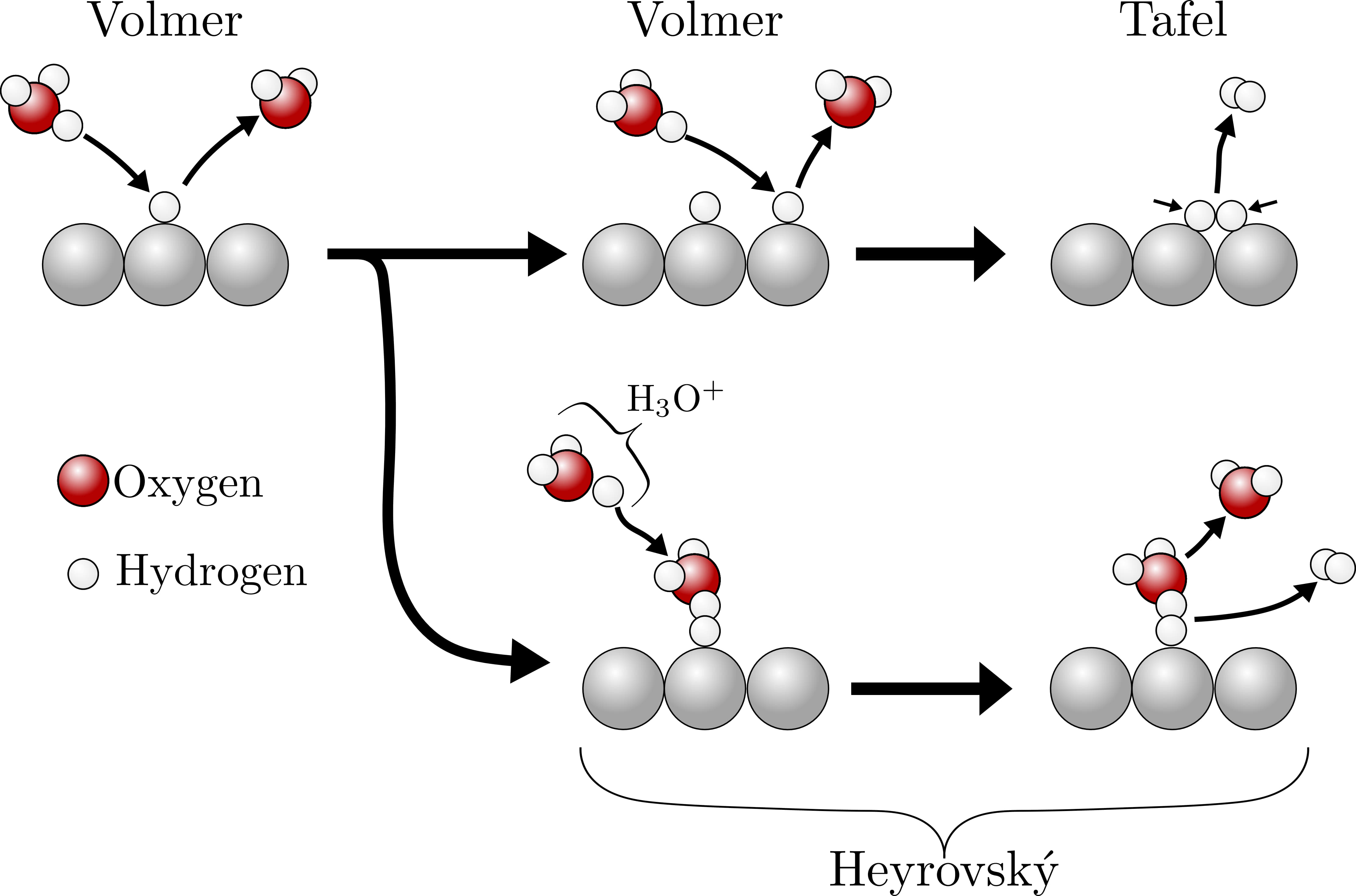
Two HER reaction pathways, Volmer-Volmer-Tafel and Volmer-Heyrovsky, in acidic conditions.

In acidic conditions, the hydrogen evolution reaction follows the formula:

2H^{+} + 2e^{−} → H_{2}

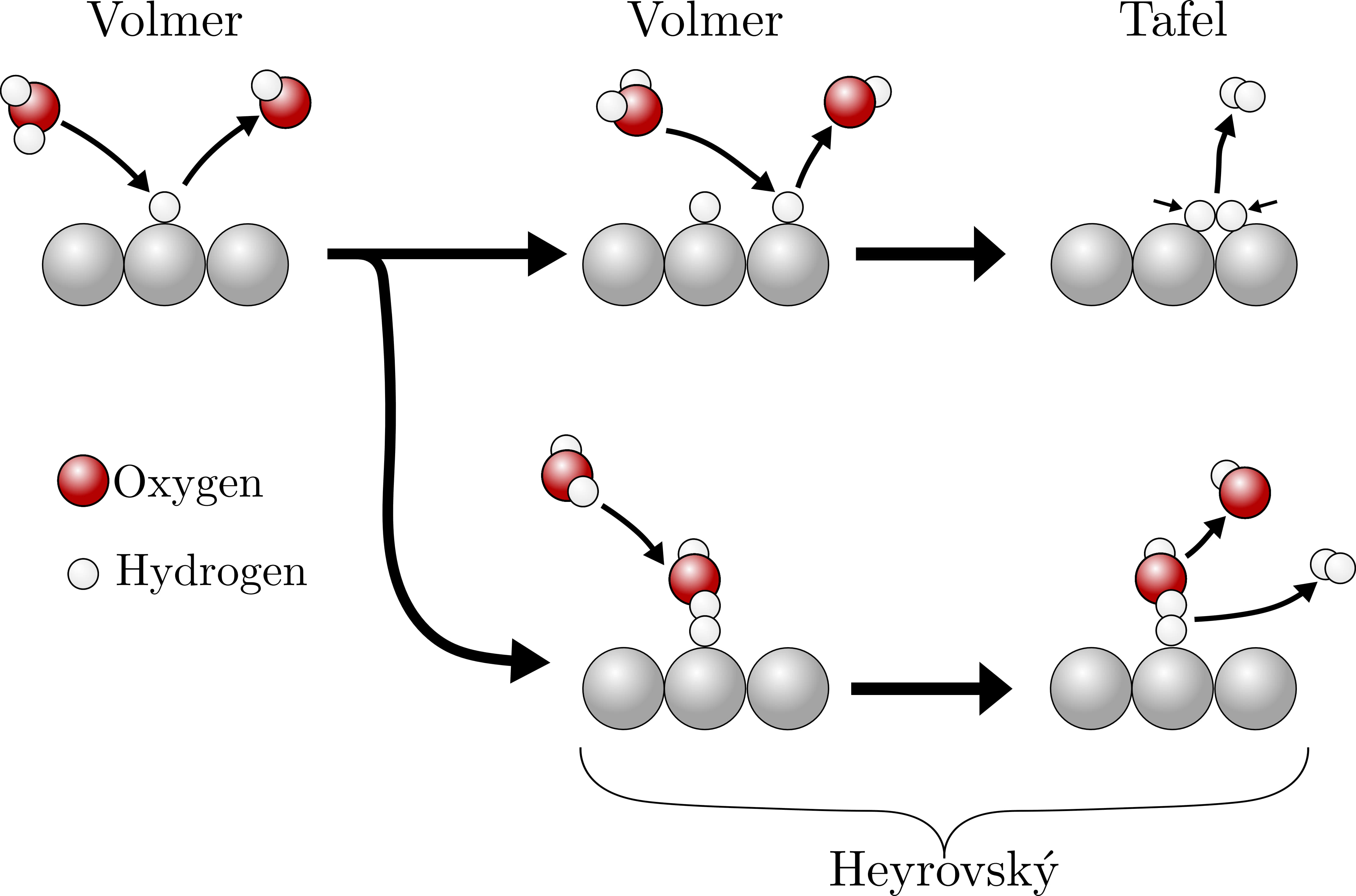
Two HER reaction pathways, Volmer-Volmer-Tafel and Volmer-Heyrovsky, in alkaline conditions.

In neutral or alkaline conditions, the reaction follows the formula:

2H_{2}O + 2e^{−} → H_{2} + 2OH^{−}

In either conditions there are two different reaction pathways: Volmer-Volmer-Tafel pathway where two protons adsorb onto the electrode surface and combine into H_{2}, and Volmer-Heyrovsky pathway, where one proton is adsorbed and molecular hydrogen is created through its interaction with electrolyte H_{2}O or H_{3}O^{+} species. Both of these mechanisms can be seen in industrial practices at the cathode side of the electrolyzer where hydrogen evolution occurs. In acidic conditions, it is referred to as proton exchange membrane electrolysis or PEM, while in alkaline conditions it is referred to simply as alkaline electrolysis. Historically, alkaline electrolysis has been the dominant method of the two, though PEM has recently began to grow due to the higher current density that can be achieved in PEM electrolysis.

=== Catalysts for HER ===
The HER process is more efficient in the presence of catalysts. Commercial alkaline electrolyzers use nickel-based catalysts at the cathode and steel at the anode. Proton exchange membrane based technology is an alternative to conventional high pressure electrolyzers. The alkalinity of the electrolyte in these processes enables the use of less expensive catalysts In PEM electrolyzers, the standard catalyst for HER is platinum supported on carbon, or Pt/C, used at the anode. The performance of a catalyst can be characterized by the level of adsorption of hydrogen into binding sites of the metal surface, as well as the overpotential of the reaction as current density increases. Anion exchange membrane (AEM) water electrolyzers are newly developed electrolyzers. In AEM electrolyzers, the standard catalyst for HER is still non-precious metal-based catalysts, such as nickel or iron.

=== Challenges ===
The high cost and energy input from water electrolysis poses a challenge to the large scale implementation of hydrogen power. The electrolysis of water is only practical where energy is cheap. While alkaline electroysis is commonly used, its limited current density capacity requires large electrical input, which poses both a cost and environmental concern due to the high carbon content of electricity in the many countries. The electrocatalysts used for electrolysis of PEM electrolyzers currently account for about 5% of the total process cost, however, as this process is scaled up.

== HER as a competing reaction ==
HER can also be an unwelcome side reaction that could compete with other reductions such as electrolyzed nitrogen fixation, electrochemical reduction of carbon dioxide, and chrome plating.
