= Photochemical reduction of carbon dioxide =

Conversion of CO2 into higher-energy products using solar energy

Photochemical reduction of carbon dioxide harnesses solar energy to convert CO_{2} into higher-energy products. Environmental interest in producing artificial systems is motivated by recognition that CO_{2} is a greenhouse gas. The process has not been commercialized.

== Overview ==
Photochemical reduction involves chemical reduction (redox) generated from the photoexcitation of another molecule, called a photosensitizer. To harness the sun's energy, the photosensitizer must be able to absorb light within the visible and ultraviolet spectrum. Molecular sensitizers that meet this criterion often include a metal center, as the d-orbital splitting in organometallic species often falls within the energy range of far-UV and visible light. The reduction process begins with excitation of the photosensitizer, as mentioned. This causes the movement of an electron from the metal center into the functional ligands. This movement is termed a metal-to-ligand charge transfer (MLCT). Back-electron transfer from the ligands to the metal after the charge transfer, which yields no net result, is prevented by including an electron-donating species in solution. Successful photosensitizers have a long-lived excited state, usually due to the interconversion from singlet to triplet states, that allow time for electron donors to interact with the metal center. Common donors in photochemical reduction include triethylamine (TEA), triethanolamine (TEOA), and 1-benzyl-1,4-dihydronicotinamide (BNAH).

An example of photoexcitation using Ru(bpy)_{3} and triethylamine. The net result is a lone electron, originating from the metal, residing in the aromatic bipyridine moiety of Ru(bpy)_{3}.

After excitation, CO_{2} coordinates or otherwise interacts with the inner coordination sphere of the reduced metal. Common products include formic acid, carbon monoxide, and methanol. Note that light absorption and catalytic reduction may occur at the same metal center or on different metal centers. That is, a photosensitizer and catalyst may be tethered through an organic linkage that provides for electronic communication between the species. In this case, the two metal centers form a bimetallic supramolecular complex. And, the excited electron that had resided on the functional ligands of photosensitizer passes through the ancillary ligands to the catalytic center, which becomes a one-electron reduced (OER) species. The advantage of dividing the two processes among different centers is in the ability to tune each center for a particular task, whether through selecting different metals or ligands.

An example of a supramolecular complex capable of photochemical reduction. Notice the photosensitizer on left tethered to the catalytic complex on the right.

== History ==
In the 1980s, Lehn observed that Co(I) species were produced in solutions containing CoCl_{2}, 2,2'-bipyridine (bpy), a tertiary amine, and a Ru(bpy)_{3}Cl_{2} photosensitizer. The high affinity of CO_{2} to cobalt centers led both him and Ziessel to study cobalt centers as electrocatalysts for reduction. In 1982, they reported CO and H_{2} as products from the irradiation of a solution containing 700ml of CO_{2}, Ru(bpy)_{3} and Co(bpy).

Since the work of Lehn and Ziessel, several catalysts have been paired with the Ru(bpy)_{3} photosensitizer. When paired with methylviologen, cobalt, and nickel-based catalysts, carbon monoxide and hydrogen gas are observed as products. Paired with rhenium catalysts, carbon monoxide is observed as the major product, and with ruthenium catalysts formic acid is observed. Some product selection is attainable through tuning of the reaction environment. Other photosensitizers have also been employed as catalysts. They include FeTPP (TPP=5,10,15,20-tetraphenyl-21H,23H-porphine) and CoTPP, both of which produce CO while the latter produces formate also. Non-metal photocatalysts include pyridine and N-heterocyclic carbenes.

A reaction scheme for the catalytic reduction of CO_{2} by Re(bpy)CO_{3}Cl. CT is an abbreviation for Charge-Transfer.

In August 2022, it was developed a photocatalyst based on lead–sulfur (Pb–S) bonds, with promising results.

== See also ==
- Artificial photosynthesis
- Electrochemical reduction of carbon dioxide
- Photoelectrochemical reduction of carbon dioxide
- Photocatalytic water splitting
