= AlgaePARC =

Wageningen UR (University & Research centre) has constructed AlgaePARC (Algae Production And Research Centre) at the Wageningen Campus. The goal of AlgaePARC is to fill the gap between fundamental research on algae and full-scale algae production facilities. This will be done by setting up flexible pilot scale facilities to perform applied research and obtain direct practical experience. It is a joined initiative of BioProcess Engineering and Food & Biobased Research of the Wageningen University.

AlgaePARC facility AlgaePARC uses four different photobioreactors comprising 24 m^{2} ground surface: an open pond, two types of tubular reactors and a plastic film bioreactor, and a number of smaller systems for the testing of new technologies. This facility is unique, because it is the first facility in which the productivity of four different production systems can be compared during the year under identical conditions. At the same time, knowledge is gained for the development of new photobioreactors and the design of systems on a production scale. For the construction of the facility 2.25 M€ has been made available by the Ministry of Agriculture, Nature and Food Quality (1.5 M€) and the Provincie Gelderland (0.75 M€).

Microalgae Microalgae are currently seen by some persons as a promising source of biodiesel and chemical building blocks, which can be used in paint and plastics. Biomass from algae offers a sustainable alternative to products and fuels from the petrochemical industry. When fully developed this contributes to a biobased economy as algae help to reduce the emissions of carbon dioxide (CO_{2}) and make the economy less dependent on fossil fuels.

AlgaePARC research The costs of biomass produced from algae for biofuels are still ten times too high to be able to compete with today’s other fuels. Within the business community, the question being asked is how it could be produced more cheaply, making it economically viable. Companies within the energy, food, oil and chemical sectors, the Ministry of Agriculture, Nature & Food Quality, the Provincial Government of Gelderland, Oost NV and Wageningen UR are all working together in or contributing to the algae research centre AlgaePARC in order to answer that question.

== See also ==
- Algae
- Microalgae
- Microbiofuels
- Photobioreactors
- Phytoplankton
- Planktonic algae
- Biofuel
