= Photoelectrochemistry =

Branch of physical chemistry

Photoelectrochemistry is a subfield of study within physical chemistry concerned with the interaction of light with electrochemical systems. It is an active domain of investigation. One of the pioneers of this field of electrochemistry was the German electrochemist Heinz Gerischer. The interest in this domain is high in the context of development of renewable energy conversion and storage technology.

== Historical approach ==
Photoelectrochemistry has been intensively studied in the 1970-80s because of the first peak oil crisis. Because the use of fossil fuels is not sustainable, it is necessary to develop processes to obtain renewable resources and use sustainable energy. Artificial photosynthesis, photoelectrochemical water splitting and regenerative solar cells are of special interest in this context. The photovoltaic effect was discovered by Alexandre Edmond Becquerel.

Heinz Gerischer, H. Tributsch, AJ. Nozik, AJ. Bard, A. Fujishima, K. Honda, PE. Laibinis, K. Rajeshwar, TJ Meyer, PV. Kamat, N.S. Lewis, R. Memming, John Bockris are researchers which have contributed a lot to the field of photoelectrochemistry.

== Semiconductor electrochemistry ==
=== Introduction ===
Semiconductor materials have energy band gaps, and will generate a pair of electron and hole for each absorbed photon if the energy of the photon is higher than the band gap energy of the semiconductor. This property of semiconductor materials has been successfully used to convert solar energy into electrical energy by photovoltaic devices.

In photocatalysis the electron-hole pair is immediately used to drive a redox reaction. However, the electron-hole pairs suffer from fast recombination. In photoelectrocatalysis, a differential potential is applied to diminish the number of recombinations between the electrons and the holes. This allows an increase in the yield of light's conversion into chemical energy.

=== Semiconductor-electrolyte interface ===
When a semiconductor comes into contact with a liquid (redox species), to maintain electrostatic equilibrium, there will be a charge transfer between the semiconductor and liquid phase if formal redox potential of redox species lies inside semiconductor band gap. At thermodynamic equilibrium, the Fermi level of semiconductor and the formal redox potential of redox species are aligned at the interface between semiconductor and redox species. This introduces an upward band bending in a n-type semiconductor for n-type semiconductor/liquid junction (Figure 1(a)) and a downward band bending in a p-type semiconductor for a p-type semiconductor/liquid junction (Figure 1(b)). This characteristic of semiconductor/liquid junctions is similar to a rectifying semiconductor/metal junction or Schottky junction. Ideally to get a good rectifying characteristics at the semiconductor/liquid interface, the formal redox potential must be close to the valence band of the semiconductor for a n-type semiconductor and close to the conduction band of the semiconductor for a p-type semiconductor. The semiconductor/liquid junction has one advantage over the rectifying semiconductor/metal junction in that the light is able to travel through to the semiconductor surface without much reflection; whereas most of the light is reflected back from the metal surface at a semiconductor/metal junction. Therefore, semiconductor/liquid junctions can also be used as photovoltaic devices similar to solid state p–n junction devices. Both n-type and p-type semiconductor/liquid junctions can be used as photovoltaic devices to convert solar energy into electrical energy and are called photoelectrochemical cells. In addition, a semiconductor/liquid junction could also be used to directly convert solar energy into chemical energy by virtue of photoelectrolysis at the semiconductor/liquid junction.

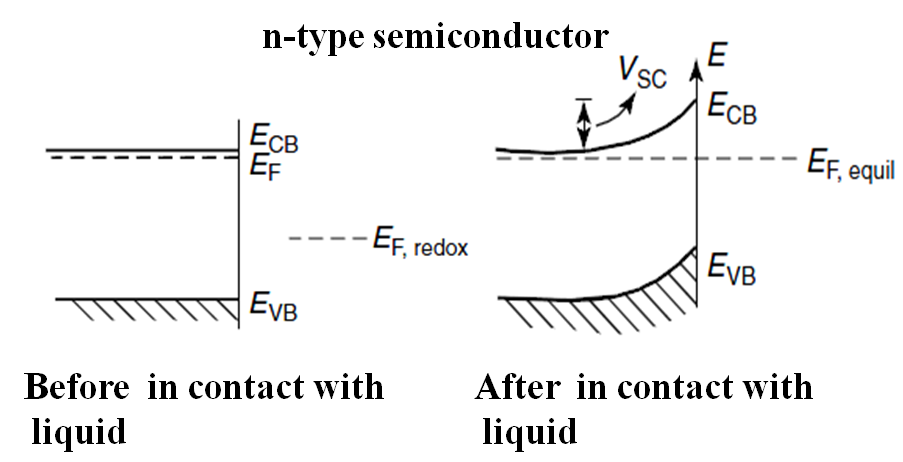
Figure 1(a) band diagram of n-type semiconductor/liquid junction

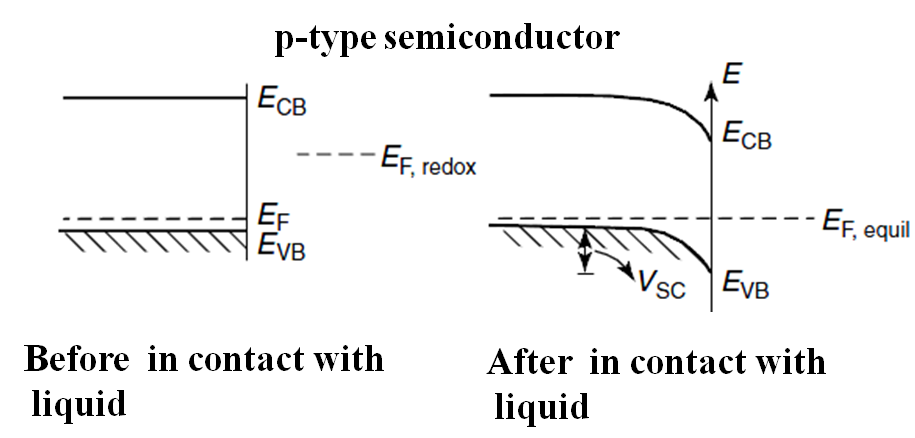
Figure 1(b) band diagram of p-type semiconductor/liquid junction

=== Experimental setup ===
Semiconductors are usually studied in a photoelectrochemical cell. Different configurations exist with a three electrode device. The phenomenon to study happens at the working electrode WE while the differential potential is applied between the WE and a reference electrode RE (saturated calomel, Ag/AgCl). The current is measured between the WE and the counter electrode CE (carbon vitreous, platinum gauze). The working electrode is the semiconductor material and the electrolyte is composed of a solvent, an electrolyte and a redox specie.

A UV-vis lamp is usually used to illuminate the working electrode. The photoelectrochemical cell is usually made with a quartz window because it does not absorb the light. A monochromator can be used to control the wavelength sent to the WE.

== Main absorbers used in photoelectrochemistry ==
=== Semiconductor IV ===
C(diamond), Si, Ge, SiC, SiGe

=== Semiconductor III-V ===
BN, BP, BAs, AlN, AlP, AlAs, GaN, GaP, GaAs, InN, InP, InAs...

=== Semiconductor II-VI ===
CdS, CdSe, CdTe, ZnO, ZnS, ZnSe, ZnTe, MoS_{2}, MoSe_{2}, MoTe_{2}, WS_{2}, WSe_{2}

=== Metal oxides ===
TiO_{2}, Fe_{2}O_{3}, Cu_{2}O

=== Organic dyes ===
Methylene blue...

=== Perovskites ===
Very recently scalable all-perovskite based PEC photoelectrochemical system as solar hydrogen panel has been developed with >123 cm2 area.

== Applications ==
=== Photoelectrochemical water splitting ===
Photoelectrochemistry has been intensively studied in the field of hydrogen production from water and solar energy. The photoelectrochemical splitting of water was historically discovered by Fujishima and Honda in 1972 onto TiO_{2} electrodes. Recently many materials have shown promising properties to split efficiently water but TiO_{2} remains cheap, abundant, stable against photo-corrosion. The main problem of TiO_{2} is its bandgap which is 3 or 3.2 eV according to its crystallinity (anatase or rutile). These values are too high and only the wavelength in the UV region can be absorbed. To increase the performances of this material to split water with solar wavelength, it is necessary to sensitize the TiO_{2}. Currently Quantum Dots sensitization is very promising but more research is needed to find new materials able to absorb the light efficiently.

=== Photoelectrochemical reduction of carbon dioxide ===
Photosynthesis is the natural process that converts CO_{2} using light to produce hydrocarbon compounds such as sugar. The depletion of fossil fuels encourages scientists to find alternatives to produce hydrocarbon compounds. Artificial photosynthesis is a promising method mimicking the natural photosynthesis to produce such compounds. The photoelectrochemical reduction of CO_{2} is much studied because of its worldwide impact. Many researchers aim to find new semiconductors to develop stable and efficient photo-anodes and photo-cathodes.

=== Regenerative cells or Dye-sensitized solar cell (Graetzel cell) ===
Dye-sensitized solar cells or DSSCs use TiO_{2} and dyes to absorb the light. This absorption induces the formation of electron-hole pairs which are used to oxidize and reduce the same redox couple, usually I^{−}/I_{3}^{−}. Consequently, a differential potential is created which induces a current.
