= Bismuth vanadate =

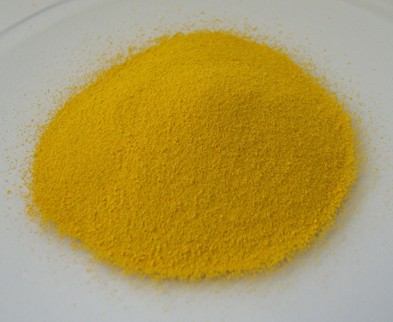

Names
- IUPAC name bismuth;trioxido(oxo)vanadium
- Other names: Bismuth orthovanadate; Pigment yellow 184

Identifiers
CAS Number	14059-33-7
3D model (JSmol)	Interactive image
ChemSpider	10764257
ECHA InfoCard	100.034.439
EC Number	237-898-0
PubChem CID	20243764
UN number	3285
CompTox Dashboard (EPA)	DTXSID20893971
- InChI: InChI=1S/Bi.4O.V/q+3;4*-2; Key: HUUOUJVWIOKBMD-UHFFFAOYSA-N
- SMILES: [O-2].[O-2].[O-2].[O-2].[V].[Bi+3]

Properties
Chemical formula	BiVO_{4}
Molar mass	323.918 g·mol^{−1}
Appearance	bright yellow solid
Odor	odorless
Density	6.25 g/cm^{3} (20 °C (68 °F))
Melting point	880–940 °C (1,620–1,720 °F; 1,150–1,210 K)
Solubility in water	insoluble
Solubility	soluble in acid
Refractive index (n_{D})	2.45

Hazards
- GHS labelling
Pictograms	(GHS08: Health hazard)
Signal word	Warning
Hazard statements	H302, H315, H319, H335
Precautionary statements	P261, P280, P304+P340, P305+P351+P338, P405, P501
NFPA 704 (fire diamond)	2 0 0
- Lethal dose or concentration (LD, LC)
LC_{50} (median concentration)	5.15 mg/L (rat, inhalation, 4 hour)
- Except where otherwise noted, data are given for materials in their standard state (at 25 °C [77 °F], 100 kPa). Infobox references

Bismuth vanadate is the inorganic compound with the formula BiVO_{4}. It is a bright yellow solid. It is widely studied as visible light photo-catalyst with a narrow band gap of less than 2.4 eV. It is a representative of "complex inorganic colored pigments," or CICPs. More specifically, bismuth vanadate is a mixed-metal oxide. Bismuth vanadate is also known under the Colour Index International as C.I. Pigment Yellow 184. It occurs naturally as the rare minerals pucherite, clinobisvanite, and dreyerite.

== Properties ==
Most commercial bismuth vanadate pigments are based on monoclinic (clinobisvanite) and tetragonal (dreyerite) structures though in the past two phase systems involving a 4:3 relationship between bismuth vanadate and bismuth molybdate (Bi_{2}MoO_{6}) have been used.

== Production ==
While most CICPs are formed exclusively through high temperature calcination, bismuth vanadate can be formed from a series of pH controlled precipitation reactions. These reactions can be carried out with or without the presence of molybdenum depending on the desired final phase.

It is also possible to start with the parent oxides (Bi_{2}O_{3} and V_{2}O_{5}) and perform a high temperature calcination to achieve a pure product.

== History and uses ==
Bismuth vanadate is a bright yellow powder and may have a slight green tint. When used as a pigment it has a high chroma and excellent hiding power. In nature, bismuth vanadate can be found as the mineral pucherite, clinobisvanite, and dreyerite depending on the particular polymorph formed. Its synthesis was first recorded in a pharmaceutical patent in 1924 and it began to be used commonly as a pigment in the mid-1980s. Today it is manufactured across the world for pigment use.

=== As a photocatalyst ===
BiVO_{4} has received attention as a photocatalyst for water splitting and for remediation. In the monoclinic phase, BiVO_{4} is an n-type photoactive semiconductor with a bandgap of 2.4 eV, which has been investigated for water splitting after doping with W and Mo. BiVO_{4} photoanodes have demonstrated record solar-to-hydrogen (STH) conversion efficiencies of 5.2% for flat films, and 8.2% for WO_{3} in BiVO_{4} core-shell nanorods (highest for metal-oxide photo-electrode) with the advantage of being a relatively simple and cheap material.
