= Hydrogenics =

Canada-based alternative energy company

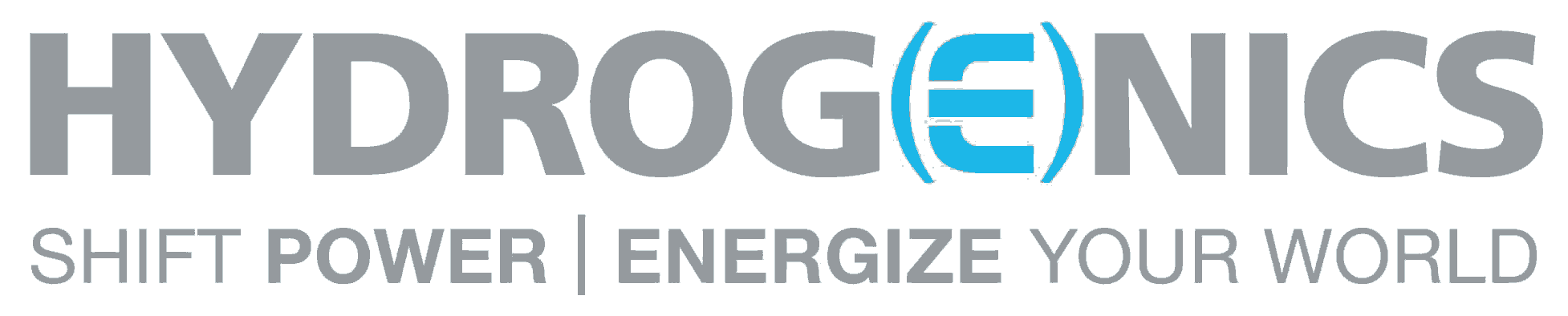
- Industry: Alternative Energy
- Founded: 1995
- Headquarters: Mississauga, Ontario, Canada
- Number of locations: Belgium, Canada, and Germany
- Key people: President and CEO Daryl Wilson
- Products: Fuel Cells; Electrolyzers
- Revenue: US$ 42.4 million
- Number of employees: 140
- Parent: Cummins Inc. (81%); Air Liquide (19%)
- Subsidiaries: Hydrogenics Europe NV; Hydrogenics GmbH
- Website: www.hydrogenics.com

Hydrogenics is a developer and manufacturer of hydrogen generation and fuel cell products based on water electrolysis and proton-exchange membrane (PEM) technology. Hydrogenics is divided into two business units: OnSite Generation and Power Systems. Onsite Generation is headquartered in Oevel, Belgium, and had 73 full-time employees as of December 2013. Power Systems is based in Mississauga, Ontario, Canada, with a satellite facility in Gladbeck, Germany. It had 62 full-time employees as of December 2013. Hydrogenics maintains operations in Belgium, Canada and Germany with satellite offices in the United States, Indonesia, Malaysia and Russia.

== Business overview ==
=== OnSite Generation ===
The OnSite Generation business segment is based on water electrolysis technology, which involves the decomposition of water into oxygen (O_{2}) and hydrogen gas (H_{2}) by passing an electric current through a liquid electrolyte. The resultant hydrogen gas is then captured and used for industrial gas applications, hydrogen fueling applications, and is used to store renewable and surplus energy in the form of hydrogen gas. Hydrogenics' HySTAT electrolyzer products can be used both indoors and outdoors.

=== Power Systems ===
The Power Systems business segment is based on PEM fuel cell technology, which transforms chemical energy resulting from the electrochemical reaction of hydrogen and oxygen into electrical energy. (Edgar) Its HyPM products can handle electrical power outputs ranging from 1 kilowatt to 1 megawatt. The company also develops and delivers hydrogen generation products based on PEM water electrolysis.

=== Power to Gas ===
Power-to-Gas is an energy process and storage technology, which takes the excess power generated by wind turbines, solar power, or biomass power plants and converts carbon dioxide and water into methane using electrolysis, enabling it be stored. The excess electricity can then be held in existing reserves, including power and natural gas grids. This allows for seasonally adjusted storage of significant amounts of power and the provision of CO_{2}-neutral fuels in the form of the resulting renewable energy source gas.

== History ==
In 1988, Hydrogenics was founded under the name Traduction Militech Translation Inc. On 20 August 1990, it changed its name to Hydrogenics Corporation and entered into the fuel cell technology development business in August 1995.

In 2002, Hydrogenics acquired EnKAT GmbH, which formed its Hydrogenics Europe division. It also acquired Greenlight Power Technologies, Inc., a competing fuel cell testing business, in 2003. A year later, in 2004, the company acquired Stuart Energy, a manufacturer of hydrogen-generation products based on alkaline electrolyte technology.

In 2007, Hydrogenics narrowed the focus of its fuel cell activities by exiting the fuel cell testing business and working more on forklift power and backup power markets. That same year, Heliocentris partnered with Hydrogenics and SMA Solar Technologie to incorporate Hydrogenics' fuel cell power modules into stationary backup power systems.

In September 2010, Hydrogenics formed an alliance with CommScope Inc., a Hickory, North Carolina–based multinational telecommunications company. Per the alliance, CommScope invested US$8.5 million in Hydrogenics as part of a joint product development program.

Hydrogenics signed a memorandum of understanding (MoU) with Iwatani Corporation, a Japanese industrial energy company, in April 2012. The companies began to collaborate on hydrogen solutions in the Japanese energy market, including utility-scale hydrogen energy storage, hydrogen generation and fuelling, fuel cell integration, and industrial hydrogen generation. Later that month Hydrogenics and Enbridge Inc. entered into a joint venture to develop utility-scale energy storage beginning in Ontario. Under the agreement, hydrogen produced during periods of excess renewable generation will be injected into Enbridge's existing natural gas pipeline network. In June 2013, Hydrogenics announced that its Power-to-Gas facility was operational with the first direct injection of hydrogen into a gas pipeline.

Hydrogenics entered into a joint venture with South Korea–based Kolon Water & Energy to provide power generation in the country in June 2014.

In 2015, Hydrogenics partnered with French railway manufacturer Alstom to provide hydrogen fuel cell systems for their hydrogen train, the Coradia iLint.

In 2019, 81% of Hydrogenics was acquired by Cummins, with the other 19% owned by Air Liquide. Hydrogenomics would report under Cummins' Electrified Power business segment, which was later renamed New Power.

In March 2023, New Power was rebranded as "Accelera by Cummins". Accelera would supply hydrogen technology developed by Hydrogenics, such as their proton exchange membrane (PEM) electrolyzer.

In April 2026, Alstom acquired Accelera's rail-dedicated hydrogen division to enhance their in-house engineering and support capabilities. This included the purchase of Cummins' fuel cell facility at Herten, Germany, which had been primarily operating to supply Alstom with hydrogen fuel cells for their trains.

In October 2026, Stargate Hydrogen acquired Cummins Accelera's Alkaline Electrolyser division called HySTAT.

=== Projects ===
In June 2000, General Motors and Hydrogenics released their codeveloped HydroGen1, a vehicle powered by a first generation proton exchange membrane fuel cell system. The following year, in October, the two companies developed low-pollution technology to power cars and trucks.

In December 2002, Natural Resources Canada (NRCan) selected Hydrogenics to develop a next-generation hybrid fuel cells bus; Hydrogenics integrated its vehicle-to-grid technology into a 12.5 meter New Flyer Inverno 40i transit bus. Hydrogenics' FC Hybrid Tecnobus midibus was exhibited in Europe in 2005.

In January 2010, Hydrogenics began development of a next-generation power system to be used for surface mobility applications on the moon for the Canadian Space Agency. The system includes an electrolyzer that produces both hydrogen and oxygen using solar power, and a fuel cell system that can be used for mobility, auxiliary, and life support systems. Heliocentris and FAUN Umwelttechnick collaborated with Hydrogenics to develop a hybrid waste disposal vehicle for BSR (Berliner Stadtreinigung) in August of that year.

In July 2012, Hydrogenics joined a consortium with EU members to build the world's largest steady state hydrogen storage facility in the Puglia region of Italy. The system is part of the R&D smart grid project "INGRID".

In April 2013, Hydrogenics won a contract to supply a 1 megawatt hydrogen energy storage system to German utility E.ON in Hamburg. The system will use electrolyzers based on Hydrogenics' proton exchange membrane (PEM) technology for hydrogen production and use excess power generated from regional renewable energy sources, primarily wind energy. In November the first of E.ON's P2G facilities provided by Hydrogenics became operational. The Falkenhagen facility uses wind-powered electrolysis equipment to transform water to hydrogen, which is then mixed with natural gas.

In February 2014, Hydrogenics was awarded two projects with the United Kingdom government. Hydrogenics will provide its technology to build hydrogen fuel stations throughout the UK.

Hydrogenics was selected as a Preferred Respondent for a power-to-gas project in Ontario by the Independent Electricity System Operator (IESO), a corporation responsible for operating the electricity market and directing the operation of the bulk electrical system in the province of Ontario, Canada, in July 2014.

== See also ==
- Power to gas
