= Solid oxide electrolyzer cell =

Type of fuel cell

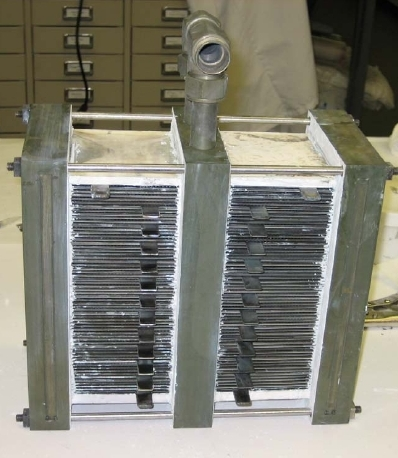
SOEC 60 cell stack.

A solid oxide electrolyzer cell (SOEC) is a solid oxide fuel cell that runs in regenerative mode to achieve the electrolysis of water (and/or carbon dioxide) by using a solid oxide, or ceramic, electrolyte to produce hydrogen gas (and/or carbon monoxide) and oxygen. The production of pure hydrogen is compelling because it is a clean fuel that can be stored, making it a potential alternative to batteries, methane, and other energy sources (see hydrogen economy). Electrolysis is currently the most promising method of hydrogen production from water due to high efficiency of conversion and relatively low required energy input when compared to thermochemical and photocatalytic methods.

== Principle ==
Solid oxide electrolyzer cells operate at temperatures which allow high-temperature electrolysis to occur, typically between 500 and 850 °C. These operating temperatures are similar to those conditions for a solid oxide fuel cell. The net cell reaction yields hydrogen and oxygen gases. The reactions for one mole of water are shown below, with oxidation of oxide ions occurring at the anode and reduction of water occurring at the cathode.

Anode: 2 O^{2−} → O_{2} + 4 e^{−}

Cathode: H_{2}O + 2 e^{−} → H_{2} + O^{2−}

Net Reaction: 2 H_{2}O → 2 H_{2} + O_{2}

Electrolysis of water at 298 K (25 °C) requires 285.83 kJ of energy per mole in order to occur, and the reaction is increasingly endothermic with increasing temperature. However, the energy demand may be reduced due to the Joule heating of an electrolysis cell, which may be utilized in the water splitting process at high temperatures. Research is ongoing to add heat from external heat sources such as concentrating solar thermal collectors and geothermal sources.

== Operation ==
The general function of the electrolyzer cell is to split water in the form of steam into pure H_{2} and O_{2}. Steam is fed into the porous cathode. When a voltage is applied, the steam moves to the cathode-electrolyte interface and is reduced to form pure H_{2} and oxygen ions. The hydrogen gas then diffuses back up through the cathode and is collected at its surface as hydrogen fuel, while the oxygen ions are conducted through the dense electrolyte. The electrolyte must be dense enough that the steam and hydrogen gas cannot diffuse through and lead to the recombination of the H_{2} and O^{2−}. At the electrolyte-anode interface, the oxygen ions are oxidized to form pure oxygen gas, which is collected at the surface of the anode.

== Materials ==
Solid oxide electrolyzer cells follow the same construction of a solid-oxide fuel cell, consisting of a fuel electrode (cathode), an oxygen electrode (anode) and a solid-oxide electrolyte.

=== Electrolyte ===
The most common electrolyte, again similar to solid-oxide fuel cells, is a dense ionic conductor consisting of ZrO_{2} doped with 8 mol-% Y_{2}O_{3} (also known as YSZ, ytrium-stabilized zirconia). Zirconium dioxide is used because of its high strength, high melting temperature (approximately 2700 °C) and excellent corrosion resistance. Yttrium(III) oxide (Y_{2}O_{3}) is added to mitigate the phase transition from the tetragonal to the monoclinic phase on rapid cooling, which can lead to cracks and decrease the conductive properties of the electrolyte by causing scattering. Some other common choices for SOEC are Scandia stabilized zirconia (ScSZ), ceria based electrolytes or lanthanum gallate materials. Despite the material similarity to solid oxide fuel cells, the operating conditions are different, leading to issues such as high steam concentrations at the fuel electrode and high oxygen partial pressures at the electrolyte/oxygen electrode interface. A recent study found that periodic cycling a cell between electrolyzer and fuel cell modes reduced the oxygen partial pressure build up and drastically increased the lifetime of the electrolyzer cell.

=== Fuel Electrode (Cathode) ===
The most common fuel electrode material is a Ni doped YSZ. However, high steam partial pressures and low hydrogen partial pressures at the Ni-YSZ interface causes oxidation of the nickel which results in catalyst degradation. Perovskite-type lanthanum strontium manganese (LSM) is also commonly used as a cathode material. Recent studies have found that doping LSM with scandium to form LSMS promotes mobility of oxide ions in the cathode, increasing reduction kinetics at the interface with the electrolyte and thus leading to higher performance at low temperatures than traditional LSM cells. However, further development of the sintering process parameters is required to prevent precipitation of scandium oxide into the LSM lattice. These precipitate particles are problematic because they can impede electron and ion conduction. In particular, the processing temperature and concentration of scandium in the LSM lattice are being researched to optimize the properties of the LSMS cathode. New materials are being researched such as lanthanum strontium manganese chromate (LSCM), which has proven to be more stable under electrolysis conditions. LSCM has high redox stability, which is crucial especially at the interface with the electrolyte. Scandium-doped LCSM (LSCMS) is also being researched as a cathode material due to its high ionic conductivity. However, the rare-earth element introduces a significant materials cost and was found to cause a slight decrease in overall mixed conductivity. Nonetheless, LCSMS materials have demonstrated high efficiency at temperatures as low as 700 °C.

=== Oxygen Electrode (Anode) ===
Lanthanum strontium manganate (LSM) is the most common oxygen electrode material. LSM offers high performance under electrolysis conditions due to generation of oxygen vacancies under anodic polarization that aid oxygen diffusion. In addition, impregnating LSM electrode with Gd-doped CeO_{2} (GDC) nanoparticles was found to increase cell lifetime by preventing delamination at the electrode/electrolyte interface. The exact mechanism by how this happen needs to be explore further. In a 2010 study, it was found that neodymium nickelate as an anode material provided 1.7 times the current density of typical LSM anodes when integrated into a commercial SOEC and operated at 700 °C, and approximately 4 times the current density when operated at 800 °C. The increased performance is postulated to be due to higher "overstoichimoetry" of oxygen in the neodymium nickelate, making it a successful conductor of both ions and electrons.

== Considerations ==
Advantages of solid oxide-based regenerative fuel cells include high efficiencies, as they are not limited by Carnot efficiency. Additional advantages include long-term stability, fuel flexibility, low emissions, and low operating costs. However, the greatest disadvantage is the high operating temperature, which results in long start-up times and break-in times. The high operating temperature also leads to mechanical compatibility issues such as thermal expansion mismatch and chemical stability issues such as diffusion between layers of material in the cell

In principle, the process of any fuel cell could be reversed, due to the inherent reversibility of chemical reactions. However, a given fuel cell is usually optimized for operating in one mode and may not be built in such a way that it can be operated in reverse. Fuel cells operated backwards may not make very efficient systems unless they are constructed to do so such as in the case of solid oxide electrolyzer cells, high pressure electrolyzers, unitized regenerative fuel cells and regenerative fuel cells. However, current research is being conducted to investigate systems in which a solid oxide cell may be run in either direction efficiently.

=== Delamination ===
Fuel cells operated in electrolysis mode have been observed to degrade primarily due to anode delamination from the electrolyte. The delamination is a result of high oxygen partial pressure build up at the electrolyte-anode interface. Pores in the electrolyte-anode material act to confine high oxygen partial pressures inducing stress concentration in the surrounding material. The maximum stress induced can be expressed in terms of the internal oxygen pressure using the following equation from fracture mechanics:

$$\sigma_{\max}=2P_\ce{O2}\left(\frac{c}{\rho}\right)^\frac{1}{2}$$

where c is the length of the crack or pore and $\rho$ is the radius of curvature of the crack or pore. If $\sigma_{\max}$ exceeds the theoretical strength of the material, the crack will propagate, macroscopically resulting in delamination.

Virkar et al. created a model to calculate the internal oxygen partial pressure from the oxygen partial pressure exposed to the electrodes and the electrolyte resistive properties. The internal pressure of oxygen at the electrolyte- anode interface was modelled as:

$$P^{a}_\ce{O2} =  P^\ce{O_\mathit{x}}_\ce{O2} \exp \left[-\frac{4F}{RT} \left\{\frac{E_{a} r^{a}_{e}}{R_{e}} - \frac{(E_{a} - E_{N})r^{a}_{i}}{R_{i}}\right\}\right]$$
$$=P^\ce{O_\mathit{x}}_\ce{O2} \exp \left[-\frac{4F}{RT} \left\{(\phi^{Ox} - \phi^a) - \frac{(E_{a} - E_{N})r^{a}_{i}}{R_{i}}\right\}\right]$$

where $P_\ce{O2}^\ce{O_\mathit{x}}$ is the oxygen partial pressure exposed to the oxygen electrode (anode), $r_e^a$ is the area specific electronic resistance at the anode interface, $r_i^a$ is the area specific ionic resistance at the anode interface, $E_a$ is the applied voltage, $E_N$ is the Nernst potential, $R_e$ and $R_i$ are the overall electronic and ionic area specific resistances respectively, and $\phi^\ce{O_\mathit{x}}$ and $\phi^a$ are the electric potentials at the anode surface and the anode electrolyte interface respectively.

In electrolysis mode ${\phi^{O_\mathit{x}}} > {\phi^a}$ and ${E_a} > {E_N}$. Whether $P_\ce{O2}^a$ is greater than $P_\ce{O2}^\ce{O_\mathit{x}}$ is dictated by whether (${\phi^\ce{O_\mathit{x}}} - {\phi^a}$ ) or $\frac{E_a r_e^a}{R_e}$ is greater than $\frac{(E_a- E_N ) r_i^a}{R_i}$ . The internal oxygen partial pressure is minimized by increasing the electronic resistance at the anode interface and decreasing the ionic resistance at anode interface.

Delamination of the anode from the electrolyte increases the resistance of the cell and necessitates higher operating voltages in order to maintain a stable current. Higher applied voltages increases the internal oxygen partial pressure, further exacerbating the degradation.

== Applications ==
SOECs have possible application in fuel production, carbon dioxide recycling, and chemicals synthesis. In addition to the production of hydrogen and oxygen, an SOEC could be used to create syngas by electrolyzing water vapor and carbon dioxide. Mega-watt scale SOEC have been installed in Rotterdam, using industrial waste heat to reach its operating temperature of 850°C .

== Research ==
In 2014 MIT successfully tested a devices used in Mars Oxygen ISRU Experiment on the Perseverance rover as a means to produce oxygen for both human sustenance and liquid oxygen rocket propellant. In April 2021, NASA claimed it has successfully produced 1 gallon of earth-equivalent oxygen (4 and 5 grams of oxygen on Mars) from CO_{2} in the Mars atmosphere.

== Operating conditions ==
SOEC modules can operate in three different modes: exothermic, endothermic and thermoneutral. In exothermic mode, the stack temperature increases during operation due to heat accumulation, and this heat is used for inlet gas preheating. Therefore, an external heat source is not needed while the electrical energy consumption increases. In the endothermic stack operation mode, there is an increase in heat energy consumption and a reduction in electrical energy consumption and hydrogen production because the average current density also decreases. The third mode is thermoneutral in which the heat generated through irreversible losses is equal to the heat required by the reaction. As there are some thermal losses, an external heat source is needed. This mode consumes more electricity than endothermic operation mode.

== See also ==
- Glossary of fuel cell terms
- Hydrogen technologies
- Alkaline water electrolysis
- Proton exchange membrane electrolysis
- Anion exchange membrane electrolysis
