= Diruthenium phosphide =

Identifiers
CAS Number	11075-05-1
3D model (JSmol)	Interactive image
- InChI: InChI=1S/P.2Ru Key: DJSOWEIVMAFVIP-UHFFFAOYSA-N
- SMILES: [P].[Ru].[Ru]

Properties
Chemical formula	PRu_{2}
Molar mass	233.11 g·mol^{−1}
Appearance	crystals
Solubility in water	insoluble

Related compounds
Related compounds	Molybdenum monophosphide, Molybdenum diphosphide
- Except where otherwise noted, data are given for materials in their standard state (at 25 °C [77 °F], 100 kPa). Infobox references

Diruthenium phosphide is a binary inorganic compound of ruthenium metal and phosphorus with the chemical formula Ru_{2}P.

== Preparation ==
Diruthenium phosphide can be prepared by heating both elements in vacuum at above 1000 °C:

8 Ru + P_{4} → 4Ru_{2}P

== Properties ==
Diruthenium phosphide forms crystals of rhombic crystal system; the structure of the lead dichloride type.

== Uses ==
Diruthenium phosphide can be used as a catalyst.
