= Unitized regenerative fuel cell =

Cell

A unitized regenerative fuel cell (URFC) is a fuel cell based on the proton exchange membrane which can do the electrolysis of water in regenerative mode and function in the other mode as a fuel cell recombining oxygen and hydrogen gas to produce electricity. Both modes are done with the same fuel cell stack

By definition, the process of any fuel cell could be reversed. However, a given device is usually optimized for operating in one mode and may not be built in such a way that it can be operated backwards. Fuel cells operated backwards generally do not make very efficient systems unless they are purpose-built to do so as in high pressure electrolyzers, unitized regenerative fuel cells and regenerative fuel cells.

== History ==
Livermore physicist Fred Mitlitsky studied the possibilities of reversible technology. In the mid-1990s Mitlitsky received some funding from NASA for development of Helios and from the Department of Energy for leveling peak and intermittent power usage with sources such as solar cells or wind turbines. By 1996 he produced a 50-watt prototype single proton-exchange membrane cell which operated for 1,700 ten-minute charge-discharge cycles, and degradation was less than a few percent at the highest current densities. A rated power of 18.5 kW URFC was installed in the Helios and was tested on-board during test flights in 2003. The aircraft unfortunately crashed on its second URFC test flight June 26, 2003.

== Structure ==
A unitized regenerative fuel cell (URFC) consists of multiple membrane electrode assemblies (MEAs) stacked together. Each MEA is composed of several functional layers arranged from the outermost to the innermost: the end plate or bipolar plates, the flow field, the gas diffusion layer (GDL) or porous transport layer (PTL), the catalyst layer, and the proton-exchange membrane (PEM).

=== End Plate and Bipolar Plate ===
The end plates and bipolar plates provide mechanical support, electrical conduction, and distribution of reactant gases and water. Materials used must resist corrosion under high voltages; therefore, titanium (Ti) or corrosion-resistant stainless steels and metal alloys are commonly employed.

=== Flow Field ===
The flow field guides gases (H₂, O₂, or air) to the electrodes, removes product gases and liquid water, and supplies water to the reaction interface during electrolysis. During operational mode switching (from water electrolysis (WE) to fuel cell (FC) mode and vice versa), the distribution of water and membrane hydration change drastically. Thus, flow field design must balance water removal (to avoid flooding) and moisture retention (to prevent membrane dehydration).

To achieve this, microchannels, interdigitated channels, or segmented supply zones are commonly used. NASA demonstrated a pump-free system that manages vapor and condensate using a loop heat pipe and a regenerative dryer, providing an alternative approach to water and thermal management.

=== Gas Diffusion Layer (GDL) or Porous Transport Layer (PTL) ===
The GDL or PTL conducts electrons, distributes reactant gases, removes or retains water, and provides mechanical support for the catalyst layer. The URFC presents contrasting wettability requirements in its two modes: during electrolysis (WE), the layer must retain water and resist oxidative corrosion, while during fuel cell operation (FC), it must facilitate gas removal and prevent flooding.

Titanium (Ti) is commonly used for PTL fabrication due to its corrosion resistance. However, Ti's hydrophilicity can hinder gas transport in FC mode. To address this, surface coatings or amphiphilic PTL designs are employed.

=== Catalysts and Catalyst Layer ===
The catalyst layer provides active sites for redox reactions—hydrogen oxidation/reduction (HOR/ORR) during fuel cell operation and oxygen/hydrogen evolution (OER/HER) during electrolysis. A major challenge in URFCs is developing bifunctional catalysts that exhibit both high activity and long-term stability under both operational modes.Traditionally, platinum (Pt) is used for HOR/HER and iridium or iridium oxide (Ir/IrO₂) for OER. Although this Pt/Ir combination remains the benchmark, it is costly and prone to degradation (oxidation and dissolution) during mode switching.

Recent studies have explored alternatives to noble metals, including transition metals such as chromium (Cr), iron (Fe), cobalt (Co), nickel (Ni), copper (Cu), tungsten (W), and tin (Sn), as well as chalcogenides, carbides, nitrides, and zeolitic imidazolate framework (ZIF)-derived catalysts. However, under the acidic environment of PEM systems, most of these materials suffer from poor durability—for example, Fe-based catalysts degrade due to Fenton reactions—and exhibit instability at high OER potentials due to oxidation or carbon corrosion. Consequently, non-precious metal catalysts still underperform compared to commercial Pt/Ir systems in URFC cycling tests.

The structure of the catalyst layer also strongly influences performance. It must balance water supply and bubble removal during electrolysis and gas transport and anti-flooding during fuel cell operation. Common configurations include mixed, layered (or sandwich), and segmented designs.In the mixed configuration, Pt and IrO₂ particles are blended into a single layer, simplifying fabrication but risking mutual interference.The layered/sandwich design places a Pt layer between IrO₂ layers, protecting Pt from high potentials and improving FC-mode performance, though fabrication is more complex.The segmented structure separates different catalysts spatially, reducing interference but lowering the effective active area.

=== Proton-Exchange Membrane (PEM) ===
The PEM conducts protons (H⁺), separates hydrogen and oxygen gases, and maintains charge balance during operation. The membrane must minimize both gas crossover (for safety and efficiency) and internal resistance—a trade-off between thin membranes (<30 μm) that lower ohmic loss but increase hydrogen permeation, and thick membranes (>120 μm) that reduce crossover but raise resistance.

Nafion membranes (e.g., NR-211, NR-212) are widely used. Recent developments include Nafion-composites incorporating graphene oxide (GO) or polypyrrole, and Aquivion-based membranes. Their performance depends on equivalent weight (EW), water uptake, and swelling behavior in dual-mode operation. Some studies indicate that Nafion NR-212 provides better durability under mode cycling due to improved hydration and mechanical stability.

== See also ==
- Glossary of fuel cell terms
- Hydrogen technologies
