= Proton exchange membrane electrolysis =

Technology for splitting water molecules

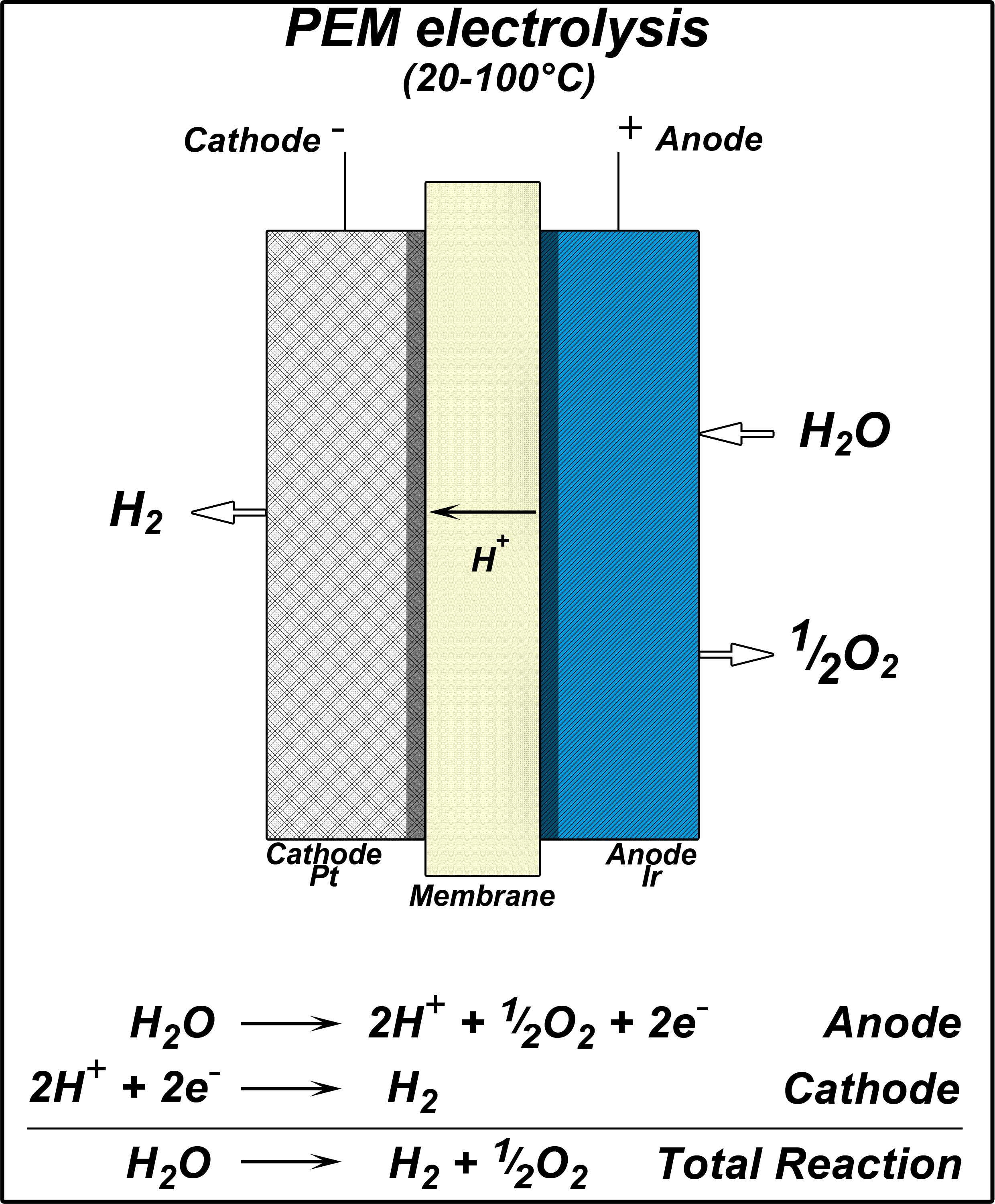
- Diagram of PEM electrolysis reactions.

Typical Materials
- Type of Electrolysis: PEM Electrolysis
- Style of membrane/diaphragm: Solid polymer
- Bipolar/separator plate material: Titanium or gold and platinum coated titanium
- Catalyst material on the anode: Iridium
- Catalyst material on the cathode: Platinum
- Anode PTL material: Titanium
- Cathode PTL material: Carbon paper/carbon fleece

State-of-the-art Operating Ranges
- Cell temperature: 50-80°C
- Stack pressure: <30 bar
- Current density: 0.6-10.0 A/cm^{2}
- Cell voltage: 1.75-2.20 V
- Power density: to 4.4 W/cm^{2}
- Part-load range: 0-10%
- Specific energy consumption stack: 4.2-5.6 kWh/Nm^{3}
- Specific energy consumption system: 4.5-7.5 kWh/Nm^{3}
- Cell voltage efficiency: 67-82%
- System hydrogen production rate: 30 Nm^{3}/h
- Lifetime stack: <20,000 h
- Acceptable degradation rate: <14 μV/h
- System lifetime: 10-20 y

Proton exchange membrane (PEM) electrolysis is the electrolysis of water in a cell equipped with a solid polymer electrolyte (SPE) that is responsible for the conduction of protons, separation of product gases, and electrical insulation of the electrodes. The PEM electrolyzer was introduced to overcome the issues of partial load, low current density, and low pressure operation currently plaguing the alkaline electrolyzer. It involves a proton-exchange membrane.

Electrolysis of water is an important technology for the production of hydrogen to be used as an energy carrier. With fast dynamic response times, large operational ranges, and high efficiencies, water electrolysis is a promising technology for energy storage coupled with renewable energy sources. In terms of sustainability and environmental impact, PEM electrolysis is considered as a promising technique for high purity and efficient hydrogen production since it emits only oxygen as a by-product without any carbon emissions. The IEA said in 2022 that more effort was needed. The availability of iridium may be a constraint for the widespread adoption of PEM technology.

== History ==
The use of a PEM for electrolysis was first introduced in the 1960s by General Electric, developed to overcome the drawbacks to the alkaline electrolysis technology. The initial performances yielded 1.0 A/cm^{2} at 1.88 V which was, compared to the alkaline electrolysis technology of that time, very efficient. In the late 1970s the alkaline electrolyzers were reporting performances around 0.215 A/cm^{2} at 2.06 V, thus prompting a sudden interest in the late 1970s and early 1980s in polymer electrolytes for water electrolysis. PEM water electrolysis technology is similar to PEM fuel cell technology, where solid poly-sulfonated membranes, such as nafion, fumapem, were used as a electrolyte (proton conductor).

A thorough review of the historical performance from the early research to that of today can be found in chronological order with many of the operating conditions in the 2013 review by Carmo et al.

== Advantages ==
One of the largest advantages to PEM electrolysis is its ability to operate at high current densities. This can result in reduced operational costs, especially for systems coupled with very dynamic energy sources such as wind and solar, where sudden spikes in energy input would otherwise result in uncaptured energy. The polymer electrolyte allows the PEM electrolyzer to operate with a very thin membrane (~100-200 μm) while still allowing high pressures, resulting in low ohmic losses, primarily caused by the conduction of protons across the membrane (0.1 S/cm) and a compressed hydrogen output.

The polymer electrolyte membrane, due to its solid structure, exhibits a low gas crossover rate resulting in very high product gas purity. Maintaining a high gas purity is important for storage safety and for the direct usage in a fuel cell. The safety limits for H_{2} in O_{2} are at standard conditions 4 mol-% H_{2} in O_{2}.

Furthermore, advanced manufacturing techniques, such as physical vapor deposition (PVD) of precious metal coatings, contribute to cost-reduction efforts. These techniques allow for a significant reduction in the amount of precious metals required for components like bipolar plates and porous transport layers, while maintaining high performance and enhancing corrosion resistance. This extends the operational lifespan of core components, thereby improving the overall lifecycle economics of the system.

== Science ==
An electrolyzer is an electrochemical device to convert electricity and water into hydrogen and oxygen, these gases can then be used as a means to store energy for later use. This use can range from electrical grid stabilization from dynamic electrical sources such as wind turbines and solar cells to localized hydrogen production as a fuel for fuel cell vehicles. The PEM electrolyzer utilizes a solid polymer electrolyte (SPE) to conduct protons from the anode to the cathode while insulating the electrodes electrically. Under standard conditions the enthalpy required for the decomposition of water is 285.9 kJ/mol. A portion of the required energy for a sustained electrolysis reaction is supplied by thermal energy and the remainder is supplied through electrical energy.

=== Reactions ===
The actual value for open circuit voltage of an operating electrolyzer will lie between the 1.23 V and 1.48 V depending on how the cell/stack design utilizes the thermal energy inputs. This is however quite difficult to determine or measure because an operating electrolyzer also experiences other voltage losses from internal electrical resistances, proton conductivity, mass transport through the cell and catalyst utilization to name a few.

The redox reactions occur at the surface of the catalyst. However, the actual catalyst surface accessible for redox reactions, called electrochemical surface area (ECSA), does not correspond to the exposed surface catalyst area, referred to as geometric surface area. Thus, maximizing the ratio between the electrochemical and the geometric surface area is crucial for enhancing the performance and for reducing noble catalyst utilization.

==== Anode reaction ====
The half reaction taking place on the anode side of a PEM electrolyzer is commonly referred to as the Oxygen Evolution Reaction (OER). Here the liquid water reactant is supplied to catalyst where the supplied water is oxidized to oxygen, protons and electrons.

$\ce{2 H2O (l) -> O2 (g) + 4H+ (aq) + 4 e^-}$

==== Cathode reaction ====
The half reaction taking place on the cathode side of a PEM electrolyzer is commonly referred to as the Hydrogen Evolution Reaction (HER). Here the supplied electrons and the protons that have conducted through the membrane are combined to create gaseous hydrogen.

$\ce{4H+ (aq) + 4 e^- -> 2H2 (g)}$

The illustration below depicts a simplification of how PEM electrolysis works, showing the individual half-reactions together along with the complete reaction of a PEM electrolyzer. In this case the electrolyzer is coupled with a solar panel for the production of hydrogen, however the solar panel could be replaced with any source of electricity.

Diagram of PEM electrolyzer cell and the basic principles of operation.

=== Second law of thermodynamics ===
As per the second law of thermodynamics the enthalpy of the reaction is:

$\Delta H = \underbrace{\Delta G}_{\textrm{elec.}} + \underbrace{T\Delta S}_{\textrm{heat}}$

Where $\Delta G$ is the Gibbs free energy of the reaction, $T$ is the temperature of the reaction and $\Delta S$ is the change in entropy of the system.

$\ce{H2O (l) + \Delta H -> H2 + 1/2 O2}$

The overall cell reaction with thermodynamic energy inputs then becomes:

$\ce{H2O (l) ->[+\overbrace{237.2 \ \ce{kJ / mol}}^{\ce{electricity}}][+\underbrace{48.6 \ \ce{kJ / mol}}_{\ce{heat}}] {H2} + 1/2 O2}$

The thermal and electrical inputs shown above represent the minimum amount of energy that can be supplied by electricity in order to obtain an electrolysis reaction. Assuming that the maximum amount of heat energy (48.6 kJ/mol) is supplied to the reaction, the reversible cell voltage $V^0_{\textrm{rev}}$ can be calculated.

=== Open circuit voltage (OCV) ===
$V^0_{\textrm{rev}}=\frac{\Delta G^0}{n\cdot F}=\frac{237 \ \textrm{kJ/mol}}{2 \times 96,485 \ \textrm{C/mol}}=1.23 \textrm{V}$

where $n$ is the number of electrons and $F$ is Faraday's constant. The calculation of cell voltage assuming no irreversibilities exist and all of the thermal energy is utilized by the reaction is referred to as the lower heating value (LHV). The alternative formulation, using the higher heating value (HHV) is calculated assuming that all of the energy to drive the electrolysis reaction is supplied by the electrical component of the required energy which results in a higher reversible cell voltage. When using the HHV the voltage calculation is referred to as the thermoneutral voltage.

$V^0_{\textrm{th}}=\frac{\Delta H^0}{n\cdot F}=\frac{285.9 \ \textrm{kJ/mol}}{2 \times 96,485 \ \textrm{C/mol}}=1.48 \textrm{V}$

=== Voltage losses ===
The performance of electrolysis cells, like fuel cells, is typically compared through polarization curves, which are obtained by plotting cell voltages against current densities. The primary sources of increased voltage in a PEM electrolyzer (the same also applies for PEM fuel cells) can be categorized into three main areas, Ohmic losses, activation losses and mass transport losses. Due to the reversal of operation between a PEM fuel cell and a PEM electrolyzer, the degree of impact for these various losses is different between the two processes.

$V_{\textrm{cell}}=E+V_{\textrm{act}} +V_{\textrm{trans}} +V_{\textrm{ohm}}$

A PEM electrolysis system's performance can be compared by plotting overpotential versus cell current density. This essentially results in a curve that represents the power per square centimeter of cell area required to produce hydrogen and oxygen. Conversely to the PEM fuel cell, the better the PEM electrolyzer the lower the cell voltage at a given current density. The figure below is the result of a simulation from the Forschungszentrum Jülich of a 25 cm^{2} single cell PEM electrolyzer under thermoneutral operation depicting the primary sources of voltage loss and their contributions for a range of current densities.

Polarization curve depicting the various losses attributed to PEM electrolysis cell operation.

==== Ohmic losses ====
Ohmic losses are an electrical overpotential introduced to the electrolysis process by the internal resistance of the cell components. This loss then requires an additional voltage to maintain the electrolysis reaction, the prediction of this loss follows Ohm's law and holds a linear relationship to the current density of the operating electrolyzer.

$V=I\cdot R$

The energy loss due to the electrical resistance is not entirely lost. The voltage drop due to resistivity is associated with the conversion the electrical energy to heat energy through a process known as Joule heating. Much of this heat energy is carried away with the reactant water supply and lost to the environment, however a small portion of this energy is then recaptured as heat energy in the electrolysis process. The amount of heat energy that can be recaptured is dependent on many aspects of system operation and cell design.

$Q\propto I^2 \cdot R$

The Ohmic losses due to the conduction of protons contribute to the loss of efficiency which also follows Ohm's law, however without the Joule heating effect. The proton conductivity of the PEM is very dependent on the hydration, temperature, heat treatment, and ionic state of the membrane.

=== Faradaic losses and crossover ===
Faradaic losses describe the efficiency losses that are correlated to the current, that is supplied without leading to hydrogen at the cathodic gas outlet. The produced hydrogen and oxygen can permeate across the membrane, referred to as crossover. Mixtures of both gases at the electrodes result. At the cathode, oxygen can be catalytically reacted with hydrogen on the platinum surface of the cathodic catalyst. At the anode, hydrogen and oxygen do not react at the iridium oxide catalyst. Thus, safety hazards due to explosive anodic mixtures hydrogen in oxygen can result. The supplied energy for the hydrogen production is lost, when hydrogen is lost due to the reaction with oxygen at the cathode and permeation from the cathode across the membrane to the anode corresponds. Hence, the ratio of the amount of lost and produced hydrogen determines the faradaic losses. At pressurized operation of the electrolyzer, the crossover and the correlated faradaic efficiency losses increase.

=== Hydrogen compression during water electrolysis ===
Hydrogen evolution due to pressurized electrolysis is comparable to an isothermal compression process, which is in terms of efficiency preferable compared to mechanical isotropic compression. However, the contributions of the aforementioned faradaic losses increase with operating pressures. Thus, in order to produce compressed hydrogen, the in-situ compression during electrolysis and subsequent compression of the gas have to be pondered under efficiency considerations.

== System operation ==
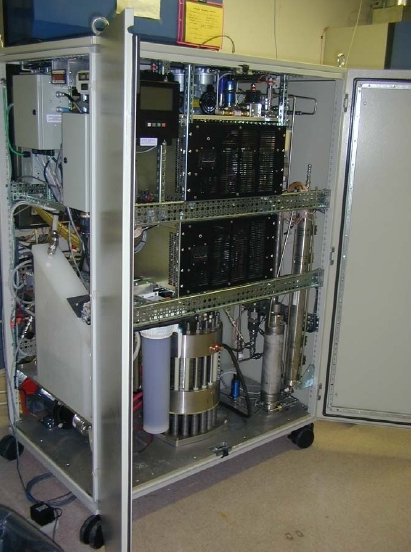
PEM high pressure electrolyzer system

The ability of the PEM electrolyzer to operate, not only under highly dynamic conditions but also in part-load and overload conditions is one of the reasons for the recently renewed interest in this technology. The demands of an electrical grid are relatively stable and predictable, however when coupling these to energy sources such as wind and solar, the demand of the grid rarely matches the generation of renewable energy. This means energy produced from renewable sources such as wind and solar benefit by having a buffer, or a means of storing off-peak energy. As of 2021, the largest PEM electrolyzer is 20 MW.

=== PEM efficiency ===
When determining the electrical efficiency of PEM electrolysis, the HHV can be used. This is because the catalyst layer interacts with water as steam. As the process operates at 80 °C for PEM electrolysers the waste heat can be redirected through the system to create the steam, resulting in a higher overall electrical efficiency. The LHV must be used for alkaline electrolysers as the process within these electrolysers requires water in liquid form and uses alkalinity to facilitate the breaking of the bond holding the hydrogen and oxygen atoms together. The lower heat value must also be used for fuel cells, as steam is the output rather than input.

PEM electrolysis has an electrical efficiency of about 80% in working application, in terms of hydrogen produced per unit of electricity used to drive the reaction. The efficiency of PEM electrolysis is expected to reach 82-86% before 2030, while also maintaining durability as progress in this area continues at a pace.

== See also ==
- Electrochemistry
- Electrochemical engineering
- Electrolysis
- Hydrogen production
- Alkaline water electrolysis
- Solid oxide electrolyzer cell
- Anion exchange membrane electrolysis
- Gas cracker
- Photocatalytic water splitting
- Water purification
- Timeline of hydrogen technologies
- Electrolysis of water
- PEM fuel cell
- Hydrogen economy
- High-pressure electrolysis
