= Electrolysis of water =

Electricity-induced chemical reaction

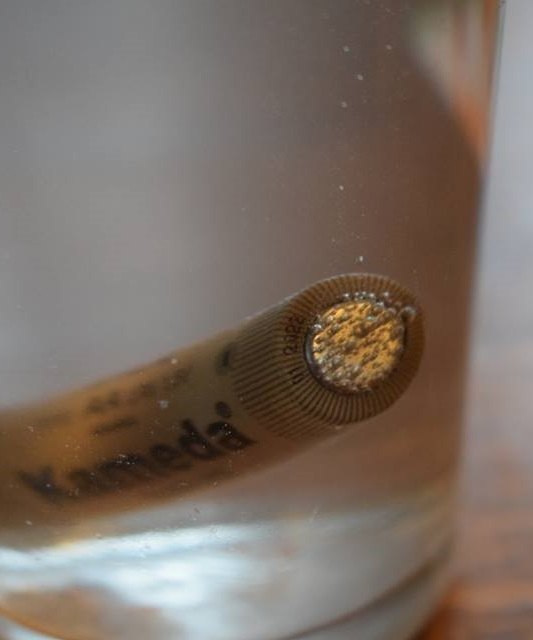
When a battery is immersed in saltwater, electrolysis produces bubbles of H_{2} gas at the negative terminal.

Water electrolysis is a term for processes that use electricity to convert liquid water (H_{2}O) into gaseous hydrogen (H_{2}) and oxygen (O_{2}). The hydrogen produced by electrolysis can be used as fuel or as an industrial feedstock, most notably for the production of fertilizers. Because the underlying chemical reaction (water splitting) does not produce greenhouse gases, the emissions footprint of electrolysis can be lower than technologies that produce hydrogen from fossil fuels (e.g. steam reforming). Maximizing the electrical efficiency and minimizing the material cost of electrolysis is a key research problem in contemporary chemical engineering, electrochemistry, and materials science.

== History ==
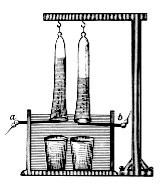
Device invented by Johann Wilhelm Ritter to develop the electrolysis of water

In 1789, Jan Rudolph Deiman and Adriaan Paets van Troostwijk used an electrostatic machine to make electricity that was discharged on gold electrodes in a Leyden jar. In 1800, Alessandro Volta invented the voltaic pile, while a few weeks later English scientists William Nicholson and Anthony Carlisle used it to electrolyse water. In 1806 Humphry Davy reported the results of extensive distilled water electrolysis experiments, concluding that nitric acid was produced at the anode from dissolved atmospheric nitrogen. He used a high voltage battery and non-reactive electrodes and vessels such as gold electrode cones that doubled as vessels bridged by damp asbestos. Zénobe Gramme invented the Gramme machine in 1869, making electrolysis a cheap method for hydrogen production. A method of industrial synthesis of hydrogen and oxygen through electrolysis was developed by Dmitry Lachinov in 1888.

== Principles ==
Assuming ideal faradaic efficiency, the amount of hydrogen generated is twice the amount of oxygen, and both are proportional to the total electrical charge conducted by the solution. However, in many cells competing side reactions occur, resulting in additional products and less than ideal faradaic efficiency.

Electrolysis of pure water requires excess energy in the form of overpotential to overcome various activation barriers. Without the excess energy, electrolysis occurs slowly or not at all. This is in part due to the limited self-ionization of water.

Pure water has an electrical conductivity about one hundred thousandth that of seawater.

Efficiency is increased through the addition of an electrolyte (such as a salt, an acid or a base) and electrocatalysts.

== Equations ==
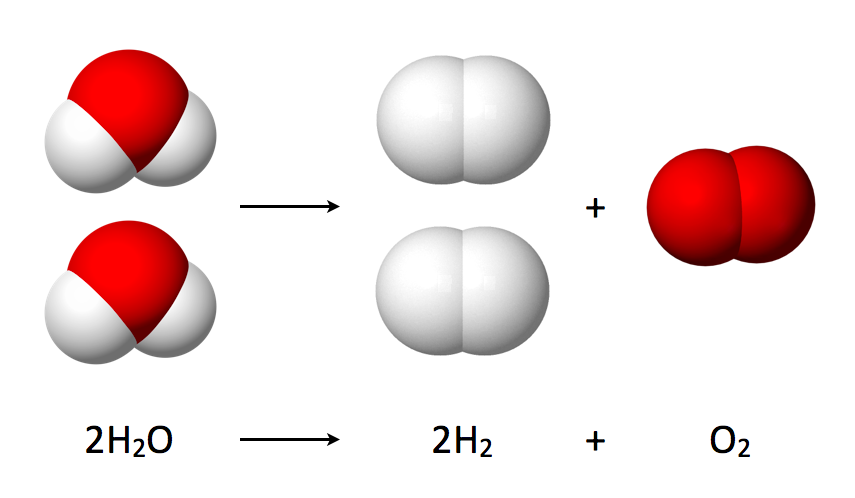
Diagram of the water splitting reaction.

At one terminal (the cathode), electrons from the power source combine with (reduce) an electron recipient (oxidant), and hydrogen gas is released. This is called the reduction half-reaction.

In acidic solutions, protons are the oxidant:

2 H^{+}_{(aq)} + 2 e^{–} (Note: Free H^{+} and e^{−} ions generally are not present in solution; these symbols are abbreviations for more complicated species like the hydronium ion.) → H_{2 (g)} (E^{⦵} = 0 V)

In basic solutions, water molecules are the oxidant:

2 H_{2}O + 2 e^{–} → H_{2 (g)} + 2 OH^{–}_{(aq)} (E^{⦵} = −0.83 V)

At the other terminal (the anode), the applied potential of the power source takes electrons from (oxidizes) an electron donor (reductant), and oxygen gas is released. This is called the oxidation half-reaction.

In acidic solutions, water molecules are the reductant:

2 H_{2}O → O_{2 (g)} + 4 H^{+}_{(aq)} + 4 e^{−} (E^{⦵} = +1.23 V) (Note: By convention, the standard potential E^{⦵} always refers to a reduction potential. Because this reaction is an oxidation, the listed E^{⦵} value corresponds to the reverse (reduction) reaction.)

In basic solutions, hydroxide ions are the reductant:

4 OH^{–}_{(aq)} → O_{2 (g)} + 2 H_{2}O + 4 e^{−} (E^{⦵} = +0.40 V)

Combining either of the reduction half-reactions with its corresponding oxidation half-reaction, balancing the equations, and canceling terms gives the overall redox reaction:

2 H_{2}O → 2 H_{2 (g)} + O_{2 (g)}

== Thermodynamics ==
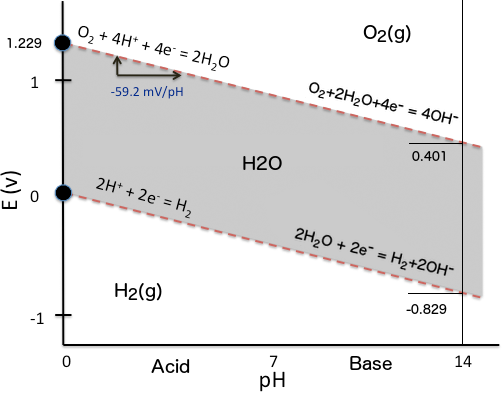
Pourbaix diagram for water, including equilibrium regions for water, oxygen and hydrogen at STP. The vertical scale is the electrode potential of hydrogen or non-interacting electrode relative to an SHE electrode, the horizontal scale is the pH of the electrolyte (otherwise non-interacting). Neglecting overpotential, above the top line the equilibrium condition is oxygen gas, and oxygen will bubble off of the electrode until equilibrium is reached. Likewise, below the bottom line, the equilibrium condition is hydrogen gas, and hydrogen will bubble off of the electrode until equilibrium is reached.

The decomposition of pure water into hydrogen and oxygen at standard temperature and pressure is not favorable in thermodynamic terms.

Anode (oxidation):	2 H_{2}O(l)	→	O_{2}(g) + 4 H^{+}(aq) + 4e^{−}	E^{o} = +1.23 V (for the reduction half-equation)
Cathode (reduction):	2 H^{+}(aq) + 2e^{−}	→	H_{2}(g)	E^{o} = 0.00 V

Thus, the standard potential of the water electrolysis cell (E^{o}_{cell} = E^{o}_{cathode} − E^{o}_{anode}) is −1.229 V at 25 °C at pH 0 ([H^{+}] = 1.0 M). At 25 °C with pH 7 ([H^{+}] = 1.0×10^{−7} M), the potential is unchanged based on the Nernst equation. The thermodynamic standard cell potential can be obtained from standard-state free energy calculations to find ΔG° and then using the equation: ΔG°= −n F E° (where E° is the cell potential and F the Faraday constant, 96,485 C/mol). For two water molecules electrolysed and hence two hydrogen molecules formed, n = 4, and

- ΔG° = 474.48 kJ/2 mol(water) = 237.24 kJ/mol(water)
- ΔS° = 163 J/K mol(water)
- ΔH° = 571.66 kJ/2 mol(water) = 285.83 kJ/mol(water)
- ΔH° = 141.86 kJ/g(H_{2}).

However, calculations regarding individual electrode equilibrium potentials requires corrections to account for the activity coefficients. In practice when an electrochemical cell is "driven" toward completion by applying reasonable potential, it is kinetically controlled. Therefore, activation energy, ion mobility (diffusion) and concentration, wire resistance, surface hindrance including bubble formation (blocks electrode area), and entropy, require greater potential to overcome. The amount of increase in required potential is termed the overpotential.

== Electrolyte ==
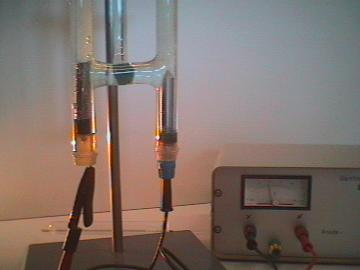
Hofmann voltameter connected to a direct current power supply

Electrolysis in pure water consumes/reduces H^{+} cations at the cathode and consumes/oxidizes hydroxide (OH^{−}) anions at the anode. This can be verified by adding a pH indicator to the water: Water near the cathode is basic while water near the anode is acidic. The hydroxides OH^{−} that approach the anode mostly combine with the positive hydronium ions (H_{3}O^{+}) to form water. The positive hydronium ions that approach the cathode mostly combine with negative hydroxide ions to form water. Relatively few hydroniums/hydroxide ions reach the cathode/anode. This can cause overpotential at both electrodes.

Pure water has a charge carrier density similar to semiconductors since it has a low autoionization, K_{w} = 1.0×10^{−14} at room temperature and thus pure water conducts current poorly, 0.055 μS/cm. Unless a large potential is applied to increase the autoionization of water, electrolysis of pure water proceeds slowly, limited by the overall conductivity.

An aqueous electrolyte can considerably raise conductivity. The electrolyte disassociates into cations and anions; the anions rush towards the anode and neutralize the buildup of positively charged H^{+} there; similarly, the cations rush towards the cathode and neutralize the buildup of negatively charged OH^{−} there. This allows the continuous flow of electricity.

Anions from the electrolyte compete with the hydroxide ions to give up an electron. An electrolyte anion with less standard electrode potential than hydroxide will be oxidized instead of the hydroxide, producing no oxygen gas. Likewise, a cation with a greater standard electrode potential than a hydrogen ion will be reduced instead of hydrogen.

Various cations have lower electrode potential than H^{+} and are therefore suitable for use as electrolyte cations: Li^{+}, Rb^{+}, K^{+}, Cs^{+}, Ba^{2+}, Sr^{2+}, Ca^{2+}, Na^{+}, and Mg^{2+}. Sodium and potassium are common choices, as they form inexpensive, soluble salts.

If an acid is used as the electrolyte, the cation is H^{+}, and no competitor for the H^{+} is created by disassociating water. The most commonly used anion is sulfate (SO^{2−}_{4}), as it is difficult to oxidize. The standard potential for oxidation of this ion to the peroxydisulfate ion is +2.010 volts.

Strong acids such as sulfuric acid (H_{2}SO_{4}), and strong bases such as potassium hydroxide (KOH), and sodium hydroxide (NaOH) are common choices as electrolytes due to their strong conducting abilities.

A solid polymer electrolyte can be used such as Nafion and when applied with an appropriate catalyst on each side of the membrane can efficiently electrolyze with as little as 1.5 volts. Several commercial electrolysis systems use solid electrolytes.

=== Pure water ===
Electrolyte-free pure water electrolysis has been achieved via deep-sub-Debye-length nanogap electrochemical cells. When the gap between cathode and anode are smaller than Debye-length (1 micron in pure water, around 220 nm in distilled water), the double layer regions from two electrodes can overlap, leading to a uniformly high electric field distributed across the entire gap. Such a high electric field can significantly enhance ion transport (mainly due to migration), further enhancing self-ionization, continuing the reaction and showing little resistance between the two electrodes. In this case, the two half-reactions are coupled and limited by electron-transfer steps (the electrolysis current is saturated at shorter electrode distances).

=== Seawater ===
Ambient seawater presents challenges because of the presence of salt and other impurities. Approaches may or may not involve desalination before electrolysis. Traditional electrolysis produces toxic and corrosive chlorine ions (e.g., Cl^{−} and ClO^{−}). Multiple methods have been advanced for electrolysing unprocessed seawater. Typical proton exchange membrane (PEM) electrolysers require desalination.

Indirect seawater electrolysis involves two steps: desalting seawater using a pre-treatment device and then producing hydrogen through traditional water electrolysis. This method improves efficiency, reduces corrosion, and extends catalyst lifespan. Some argue that the costs of seawater desalination are relatively small compared to water splitting, suggesting that research should focus on developing more efficient two-step desalination-coupled water splitting processes.

However, indirect seawater electrolysis plants require more space, energy, and more maintenance, and some believe that the water purity achieved through seawater reverse osmosis (SWRO) may not be sufficient, necessitating additional equipment and cost. In contrast, direct seawater electrolysis skips the pre-treatment step and introduces seawater directly into the electrolyzer to produce hydrogen. This approach is seen as more promising due to limited freshwater resources, the need to prioritize basic human needs, and the potential to reduce energy consumption and costs. Membranes are critical for the efficiency of electrolysis, but they can be negatively affected by foreign ions in seawater, shortening their lifespan and reducing the efficiency of the electrolysis process.

One approach involves combining forward osmosis membranes with water splitting to produce hydrogen continuously from impure water sources. Water splitting generates a concentration gradient balanced by water influx via forward osmosis, allowing for continual extraction of pure water. However, this configuration has challenges such as the potential for Cl ions to pass through the membrane and cause damage, as well as the risk of hydrogen and oxygen mixing without a separator.

To address these issues, a low-cost semipermeable membrane was introduced between the electrodes to separate the generated gases, reducing membrane costs and minimizing Cl oxidation. Additionally, research shows that using transition metal-based materials can support water electrolysis efficiently. Some studies have explored the use of low-cost reverse osmosis membranes (<10$/m^{2}) to replace expensive ion exchange membranes (500-1000$/m^{2}). The use of reverse osmosis membranes becomes economically attractive in water electrolyzer systems as opposed to ion exchange membranes due to their cost-effectiveness and the high proton selectivity they offer for cation salts, especially when high-concentration electrolytes are employed.

An alternative method involves employing a hydrophobic membrane to prevent ions from entering the cell stack. This method combines a hydrophobic porous polytetrafluoroethylene (PTFE) waterproof breathable membrane with a self-dampening electrolyte, utilizing a hygroscopic sulfuric acid solution with a commercial alkaline electrolyzer to generate hydrogen gas from seawater. At a larger scale, this seawater electrolysis system can consistently produce 386 L of H_{2} per hour for over 3200 hours without experiencing significant catalyst corrosion or membrane wetting. The process capitalizes on the disparity in water vapor pressure between seawater and the self-dampening electrolyte to drive seawater evaporation and water vapor diffusion, followed by the liquefaction of the adsorbed water vapor on the self-dampening electrolyte.

== Techniques ==
As of 2022, commercial electrolysis requires around 53 kWh of electricity to produce one kg of hydrogen, which holds 39.4 kWh (HHV) of energy.

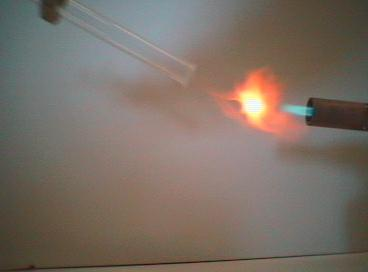
Match test used to detect the presence of hydrogen gas

=== Hofmann voltameter ===
The Hofmann voltameter is a small-scale electrolytic cell. It consists of three joined upright cylinders. The inner cylinder is open at the top to allow the addition of water and electrolyte. A platinum electrode (plate or honeycomb) is placed at the bottom of each of the two side cylinders, connected to the terminals of an electricity source. The generated gases displace water and collect at the top of the two outer tubes, where it can be drawn off with a stopcock.

=== High-pressure ===
High-pressure electrolysis involves compressed hydrogen output around 12–20 MPa (120–200 Bar, 1740–2900 psi). By pressurising the hydrogen in the electrolyser, the need for an external hydrogen compressor is eliminated. The average energy consumption is around 3%.

=== High-temperature ===
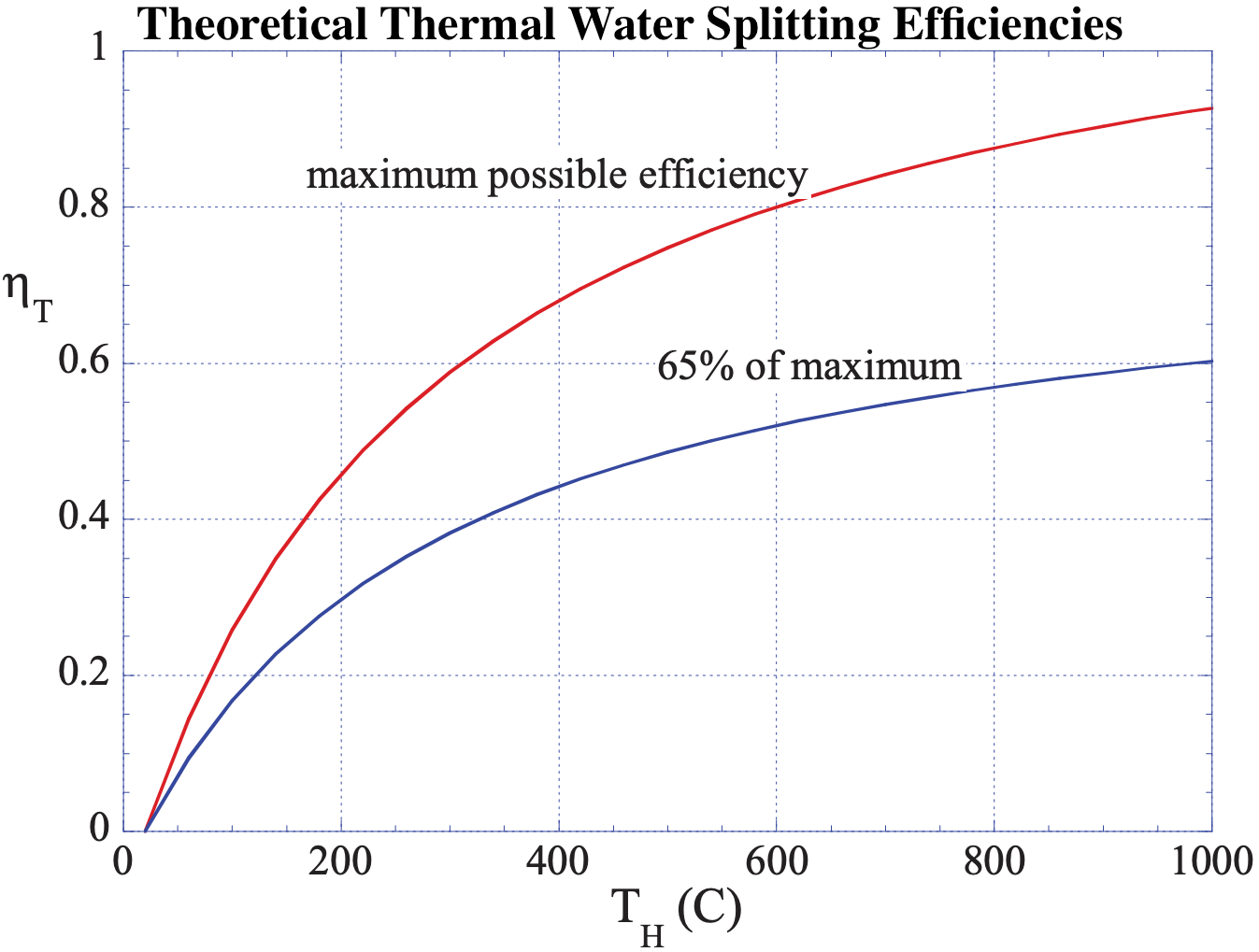
Theoretical thermal water splitting efficiencies. 60% efficient at 1000°C Steam reforming of hydrocarbons to hydrogen is 70-85% efficient

High-temperature electrolysis (also HTE or steam electrolysis) is more efficient at higher temperatures. A heat engine supplies some of the energy, which is typically cheaper than electricity.

=== Alkaline water electrolysis ===
Alkaline water electrolysis is a type of electrolysis that is characterized by having two electrodes operating in a liquid alkaline electrolyte. Commonly, a solution of potassium hydroxide (KOH) or sodium hydroxide (NaOH) at 25-40 wt% is used. These electrodes are separated by a diaphragm, separating the product gases and transporting the hydroxide ions (OH^{−}) from one electrode to the other. A recent comparison showed that state-of-the-art nickel based water electrolysers with alkaline electrolytes lead to competitive or even better efficiencies than acidic polymer electrolyte membrane water electrolysis with platinum group metal based electrocatalysts.

The technology has a long history in the chemical industry. The first large-scale demand for hydrogen emerged in late 19th century for lighter-than-air aircraft, and before the advent of steam reforming in the 1930s, the technique was competitive.

Hydrogen-based technologies have evolved significantly since the initial discovery of hydrogen and its early application as a buoyant gas approximately 250 years ago. In 1804, the Swiss inventor Francois Isaac de Rivaz secured a patent for the inaugural hydrogen-powered vehicle. This prototype, equipped with a four-wheel design, utilised an internal combustion engine (ICE) fuelled by a mixture of hydrogen and oxygen gases. The hydrogen fuel was stored in a balloon, and ignition was achieved through an electrical starter known as a Volta starter. The combustion process propelled the piston within the cylinder, which, upon descending, activated a wheel through a ratchet mechanism. This invention could be viewed as an early embodiment of a system comprising hydrogen storage, conduits, valves, and a conversion device.

Approximately four decades after the military scientist Ritter developed the first electrolyser, the chemists Schoenbein and Sir Grove independently identified and showcased the fuel cell concept. This technology operates in reverse to electrolysis around the year 1839. This discovery marked a significant milestone in the field of hydrogen technology, demonstrating the potential for hydrogen as a source of clean energy.

=== Proton exchange membrane ===
A proton-exchange membrane electrolyser separates reactants and transports protons while blocking a direct electronic pathway through the membrane. PEM fuel cells use a solid polymer membrane (a thin plastic film) which is permeable to hydrogen ions (protons) when it is saturated with water, but does not conduct electrons.

It uses a proton-exchange membrane, or polymer-electrolyte membrane (PEM), which is a semipermeable membrane generally made from ionomers and designed to conduct protons while acting as an insulator and reactant barrier, e.g. to oxygen and hydrogen gas. PEM fuel cells use a solid polymer membrane (a thin plastic film) that is permeable to protons when saturated with water, but does not conduct electrons. Proton-exchange membranes are primarily characterized by proton conductivity (σ), methanol permeability (P), and thermal stability.

PEMs can be made from either pure polymer or from composite membranes, where other materials are embedded in a polymer matrix. One of the most common commercially available materials is the fluoropolymer (PFSA) Nafion. Nafion is an ionomer with a perfluorinated backbone such as Teflon. Many other structural motifs are used to make ionomers for proton-exchange membranes. Many use polyaromatic polymers, while others use partially fluorinated polymers.

=== Anion exchange membrane ===
Anion exchange membrane electrolysis employs an anion-exchange membrane (AEM) to achieve the separation of products, provide electrical insulation between electrodes, and facilitate ion conduction. In contrast to PEM electrolysis, AEM electrolysis allows for the conduction of hydroxide ions. A noteworthy benefit of AEM-based water electrolysis is the elimination of the need for expensive noble metal catalysts, as cost-effective transition metal catalysts can be utilized in their place.

=== Supercritical water ===
Supercritical water electrolysis (SWE) uses water in a supercritical state. Supercritical water requires less energy, therefore reducing costs. It operates at >375 °C, which reduces thermodynamic barriers and increases kinetics, improving ionic conductivity over liquid or gaseous water, which reduces ohmic losses. Benefits include improved electrical efficiency, >221bar pressurised delivery of product gases, ability to operate at high current densities and low dependence on precious metal catalysts. As of 2021 commercial SWE equipment was not available.

=== Nickel/iron ===
In 2014, researchers announced electrolysis using nickel and iron catalysts rather than precious metals. Nickel-metal/nickel-oxide structure is more active than nickel metal or nickel oxide alone. The catalyst significantly lowers the required voltage. Nickel–iron batteries are under investigation for use as combined batteries and electrolysers. Those "battolysers" could be charged and discharged like conventional batteries, and would produce hydrogen when fully charged.

In 2023, researchers in Australia announced the use of a porous sheet of nitrogen-doped nickel molybdenum phosphide catalyst. The nitrogen doping increases conductivity and optimizes electronic density and surface chemistry. This produces additional catalytic sites. The nitrogen bonds to the surface metals and has electro-negative properties that help exclude unwanted ions and molecules, while phosphate, sulfate, nitrate and hydroxyl surface ions block chlorine and prevent corrosion. 10 mA/cm^{2} can be achieved using 1.52 and 1.55 V in alkaline electrolyte and seawater, respectively.

=== Nanogap electrochemical cells ===
In 2017, researchers reported nanogap electrochemical cells that achieved high-efficiency electrolyte-free pure water electrolysis at ambient temperature. In these cells, the two electrodes are so close to each other (smaller than Debye-length) that the mass transport rate can be higher than the electron-transfer rate, leading to two half-reactions coupled together and limited by the electron-transfer step. Experiments show that the electrical current density can be larger than that from 1 mol/L sodium hydroxide solution. Its "Virtual Breakdown Mechanism", is completely different from traditional electrochemical theory, due to such nanogap size effects.

=== Capillary fed ===
A capillary-fed electrolyzer cell is claimed to require only 41.5 kWh to produce 1 kg of hydrogen. The water electrolyte is isolated from the electrodes by a porous, hydrophilic separator. The water is drawn into the electrolyzer by capillary action, while the electrolyzed gases pass out on either side. It extends PEM technology by eliminating bubbles that reduce the contact between the electrodes and the electrolyte, reducing efficiency. The design is claimed to operate at 98% energy efficiency (higher heating value of hydrogen). The design forgoes water circulation, separator tanks, and other mechanism and can be air- or radiatively cooled. The effect of the build-up of impurities in the cell from those initially present in the feed water is not yet available.

=== Decoupled water electrolysis ===
Decoupled water electrolysis produces hydrogen and oxygen in separate stages, removing the need for a membrane between simultaneously generated gases. In one such scheme, an electrochemical step generates hydrogen at the cathode while the anode is oxidized from nickel hydroxide to nickel oxyhydroxide; in a second, thermally activated chemical step, the anode spontaneously releases oxygen and returns to its initial state, enabling membrane-free operation. H2Pro's E-TAC electrolyzer uses this two-stage approach.

== Applications ==
Electrolysis accounts for only a small fraction of global hydrogen production, with low-emissions hydrogen representing less than 1% of the roughly 97 million tonnes produced worldwide in 2023; the vast majority of current industrial hydrogen production is from natural gas in the steam reforming process, or from the partial oxidation of coal or heavy hydrocarbons. Much of the hydrogen associated with electrolysis has historically been generated as a by-product of chlor-alkali brine electrolysis rather than dedicated water electrolysis, although dedicated capacity is growing rapidly.

2NaCl + 2H_{2}O → Cl_{2} + H_{2} + 2NaOH

In the chloralkali process (electrolysis of brine) a water/sodium chloride mixture is only half the electrolysis of water since the chloride ions are oxidized to chlorine rather than water being oxidized to oxygen. Thermodynamically, this would not be expected since the oxidation potential of the chloride ion is less than that of water, but the rate of the chloride reaction is much greater than that of water, causing it to predominate. The hydrogen produced from this process is either burned (converting it back to water), used for the production of specialty chemicals, or various other small-scale applications.

Water electrolysis is also used to generate oxygen for the International Space Station.

Many industrial electrolysis cells are similar to Hofmann voltameters, with platinum plates or honeycombs as electrodes. Generally, hydrogen is produced for point of use applications such as oxyhydrogen torches or when high purity hydrogen or oxygen is desired. The vast majority of hydrogen is produced from hydrocarbons and as a result, contains trace amounts of carbon monoxide among other impurities. The carbon monoxide impurity can be detrimental to various systems including many fuel cells.

As electrolysers can be ramped down they might in future be used to cope with electricity supply demand mismatch.

== Efficiency ==
=== Industrial output ===
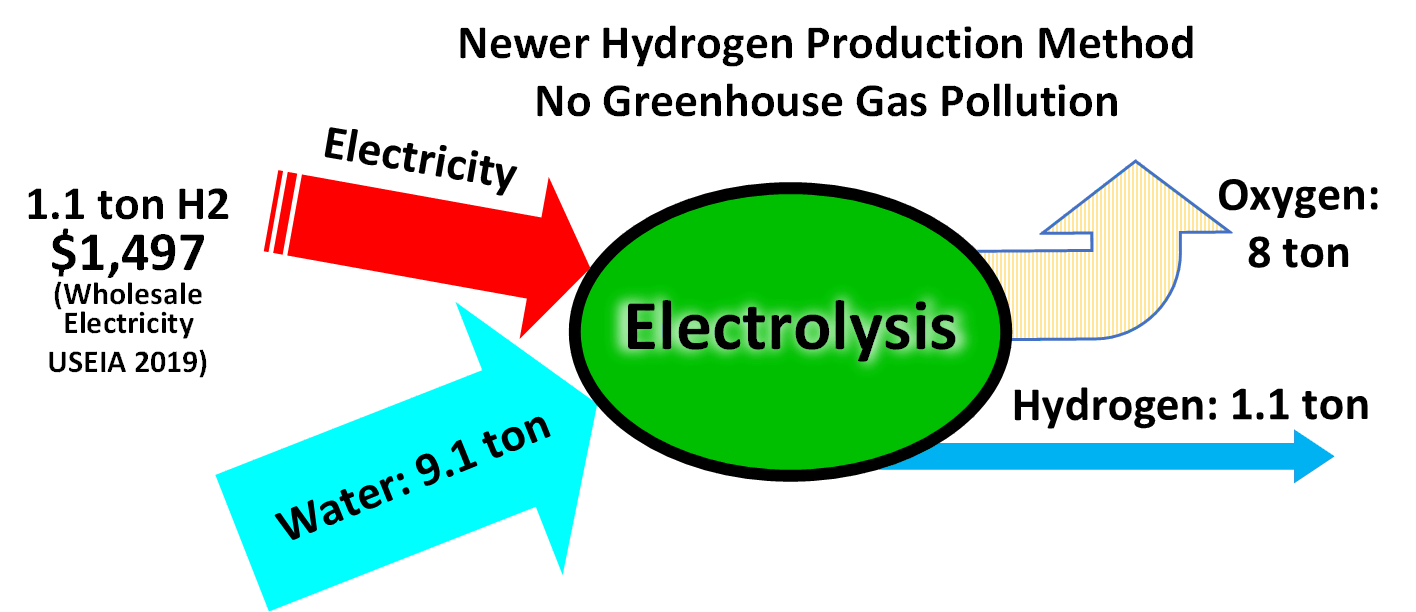
Illustrating inputs and outputs of simple electrolysis of water, for production of hydrogen.

Efficiency of modern hydrogen generators is measured by energy consumed per standard volume of hydrogen (MJ/m^{3}), assuming standard temperature and pressure of the H_{2}. The lower the energy used by a generator, the higher its efficiency would be; a 100%-efficient electrolyser would consume 39.4 kilowatt-hours per kilogram (142 MJ/kg) (higher heating value) of hydrogen, 12,749 joules per litre (12.75 MJ/m^{3}). Practical electrolysis (using a rotating electrolyser at 15 bar pressure) may consume 50 kW⋅h/kg (180 MJ/kg), and a further 15 kW⋅h (54 MJ) if the hydrogen is compressed for use in hydrogen cars. By adding external heat at 150 °C (302 °F), electricity consumption may be reduced.

There are three main technologies available on the market: alkaline, proton exchange membrane (PEM), and solid oxide electrolyzers.

Alkaline electrolyzers are cheaper in terms of investment (they generally use nickel catalysts), but least efficient. PEM electrolyzers are more expensive (they generally use expensive platinum-group metal catalysts) but are more efficient and can operate at higher current densities, and can, therefore, be possibly cheaper if the hydrogen production is large enough. Solid oxide electrolyzer cells (SOEC) are the third most common type of electrolysis, and the most expensive, and use high operating temperatures to increase efficiency. The theoretical electrical efficiency of SOEC is close to 100% at 90% hydrogen production. Degradation of the system over time does not affect the efficiency of SOEC electrolyzers initially unlike PEM and alkaline electrolyzers. As the SOEC system degrades, the cell voltage increases, producing more heat in the system naturally. Due to this, less energy is required to keep the system hot, which will make up for the energy losses from dramatic degradation initially. SOEC requires replacement of the stack after some years of degradation.

==== Efficiency ====
Electrolyzer vendors provide efficiencies based on enthalpy. To assess the claimed efficiency of an electrolyzer it is important to establish how it was defined by the vendor (i.e. what enthalpy value, what current density, etc.).

Conventional alkaline electrolysis has an efficiency of about 70%. Accounting for the accepted use of the higher heating value (because inefficiency via heat can be redirected back into the system to create the steam required by the catalyst), average working efficiencies for PEM electrolysis are around 80%. This is expected to increase to between 82 and 86% before 2030. Theoretical efficiency for PEM electrolysers are predicted up to 94%.

In 2024, Australian company Hysata announced a device capable of 95% efficiency relative to the higher heating value of hydrogen. Conventional systems consume 52.5 kWh to produce hydrogen that can store 39.4 kWh of energy (1 kg). Its technology requires only 41.5 kWh to produce 1 kg. It uses a capillary-fed electrolyzer to eliminate hydrogen and oxygen bubbles in the fluid electrolyte. Bubbles are non-conductive, and can stick to electrodes, reducing electrode exposure to the electrolyte, increasing resistance. Hysata places the electrolyte at the bottom of the device. Capillary action draws it through a porous, hydrophilic separator between the electrodes. Each electrode has complete contact with the electrolyte on the inner side, and a dry chamber on the outer side. The effect of the build-up of impurities in the cell from those initially present in the feed water is not yet available.

==== Cost ====
Calculating cost is complicated, and a market price barely exists. Considering the industrial production of hydrogen, and using current best processes for water electrolysis (PEM or alkaline electrolysis) which have an effective electrical efficiency of 70–80%, producing 1 kg of hydrogen (which has a specific energy of 143 MJ/kg) requires 50–55 kW⋅h (180–200 MJ) of electricity. At an electricity cost of $0.06/kW·h, as set out in the US Department of Energy hydrogen production targets for 2015, the hydrogen cost is $3/kg. Equipment cost depends on mass production, and the cost of electrolyzers rose 50% between 2021 and 2024. Operating cost depends on electricity cost for about half of the levelised product price.

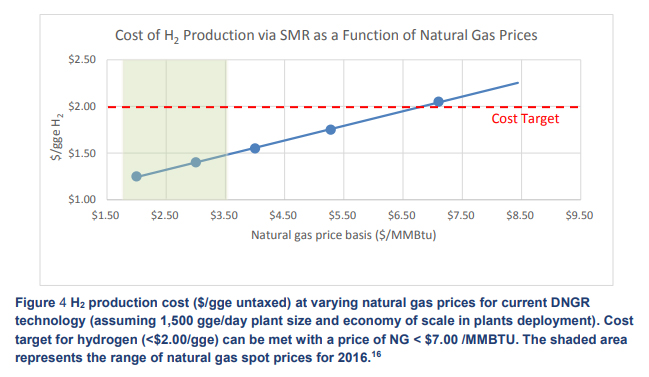
H_{2} production cost ($-gge untaxed) at varying natural gas prices

==== Comparison with steam-methane-reformed (SMR) hydrogen ====
With the range of natural gas prices from 2016 as shown in the graph (Hydrogen Production Tech Team Roadmap, November 2017) putting the cost of steam-methane-reformed (SMR) hydrogen at between $1.20 and $1.50, the cost price of hydrogen via electrolysis is still over double 2015 DOE hydrogen target prices. The US DOE target price for hydrogen in 2020 is $2.30/kg, requiring an electricity cost of $0.037/kW·h, which is achievable given 2018 PPA tenders for wind and solar in many regions. This puts the $4/gasoline gallon equivalent (gge) H_{2} dispensed objective well within reach, and close to a slightly elevated natural gas production cost for SMR.

In other parts of the world, the price of SMR hydrogen is by between $1–3/kg on average. This makes production of hydrogen via electrolysis cost competitive in many regions already, as outlined by Nel Hydrogen and others, including an article by the IEA examining the conditions which could lead to a competitive advantage for electrolysis. The large price increase of gas during the 2021–2022 global energy crisis made hydrogen electrolysis economic in some parts of the world.

==== Facilities ====
Some large industrial electrolyzers are operating at several megawatts. As of 2022, the largest is a 150 MW alkaline facility in Ningxia, China, with a capacity up to 23,000 tonnes per year. While higher-efficiency Western electrolysis equipment can cost $1,200/kW, lower-efficiency Chinese equipment can cost $300/kW, but with a lower lifetime of 60,000 hours.

As of 2022, different analysts predict annual manufacture of equipment by 2030 as 47 GW, 104 GW and 180 GW, respectively.

=== Overpotential ===
Real water electrolyzers require higher voltages for the reaction to proceed. The part that exceeds 1.23 V is called overpotential or overvoltage, and represents any kind of loss and nonideality in the electrochemical process.

For an ideal cell, the largest overpotential is the reaction overpotential for the four-electron oxidation of water to dioxygen at the anode. This reaction can be accelerated by electrocatalysts, with platinum-based alloys commonly regarded as benchmark materials for this process. There are many approaches, among them a 30-year-old recipe for molybdenum sulfide, graphene quantum dots, carbon nanotubes, perovskite, and nickel/nickel-oxide. Trimolybdenum phosphide (Mo_{3}P) has been reported as a nonprecious metal and earth‐abundant candidate with outstanding catalytic properties that can be used for electrocatalytic processes. The catalytic performance of Mo3P nanoparticles is tested in the hydrogen evolution reaction (HER), indicating an onset potential of as low as 21 mV, H2 formation rate, and exchange current density of 214.7 μmol/(s·g) cat (at only 100 mV overpotential) and 279.07 μA/cm^{2}, respectively, which are among the closest values yet observed to platinum.

The simpler two-electron reaction to produce hydrogen at the cathode can be electrocatalyzed with almost no overpotential by platinum, or in theory a hydrogenase enzyme. If other, less effective, materials are used for the cathode (e.g. graphite), large overpotentials will appear.

=== Thermodynamics ===
The electrolysis of water in standard conditions requires a theoretical minimum of 237 kJ of electrical energy input to dissociate each mole of water, which is the standard Gibbs free energy of formation of water. It also requires thermal energy to balance the change in entropy of the reaction. Therefore, the process cannot proceed at constant temperature at electrical energy inputs below 286 kJ per mol if no external thermal energy is added.

Since each mole of water requires two moles of electrons, and given that the Faraday constant F represents the charge of a mole of electrons (96485 C/mol), it follows that the minimum voltage necessary for electrolysis is about 1.23 V. If electrolysis is carried out at high temperature, this voltage reduces. This effectively allows the electrolyser to operate at more than 100% electrical efficiency. In electrochemical systems this means that heat must be supplied to the reactor to sustain the reaction. In this way thermal energy can be used for part of the electrolysis energy requirement. In a similar way the required voltage can be reduced (below 1 V) if fuels (such as carbon, alcohol, biomass) are reacted with water (PEM based electrolyzer in low temperature) or oxygen ions (solid oxide electrolyte based electrolyzer in high temperature). This results in some of the fuel's energy being used to "assist" the electrolysis process and can reduce the overall cost of hydrogen produced.

However, observing the entropy component (and other losses), voltages over 1.48 V are required for the reaction to proceed at practical current densities (the thermoneutral voltage).

In the case of water electrolysis, Gibbs free energy represents the minimum work necessary for the reaction to proceed, and the reaction enthalpy is the amount of energy (both work and heat) that has to be provided so the reaction products are at the same temperature as the reactant (i.e. standard temperature for the values given above). Potentially, an electrolyzer operating at 1.48 V would operate isothermally at a temperature of 25°C as the electrical energy supplied would be equal to the enthalpy (heat) of water decomposition and this would require 20% more electrical energy than the minimum.

== See also ==
- Electrocatalyst
- Electrochemistry
- Electrochemical cell
- Electrochemical engineering
- Electrolysis
- Gas cracker
- Hydrogen production
- Methane pyrolysis (for Hydrogen)
- Noryl
- Photoelectrolysis of water
- Photocatalytic water splitting
- Electrochemical reduction of carbon dioxide
- Timeline of hydrogen technologies
- Water purification
