= High-temperature electrolysis =

Technique for producing hydrogen from water

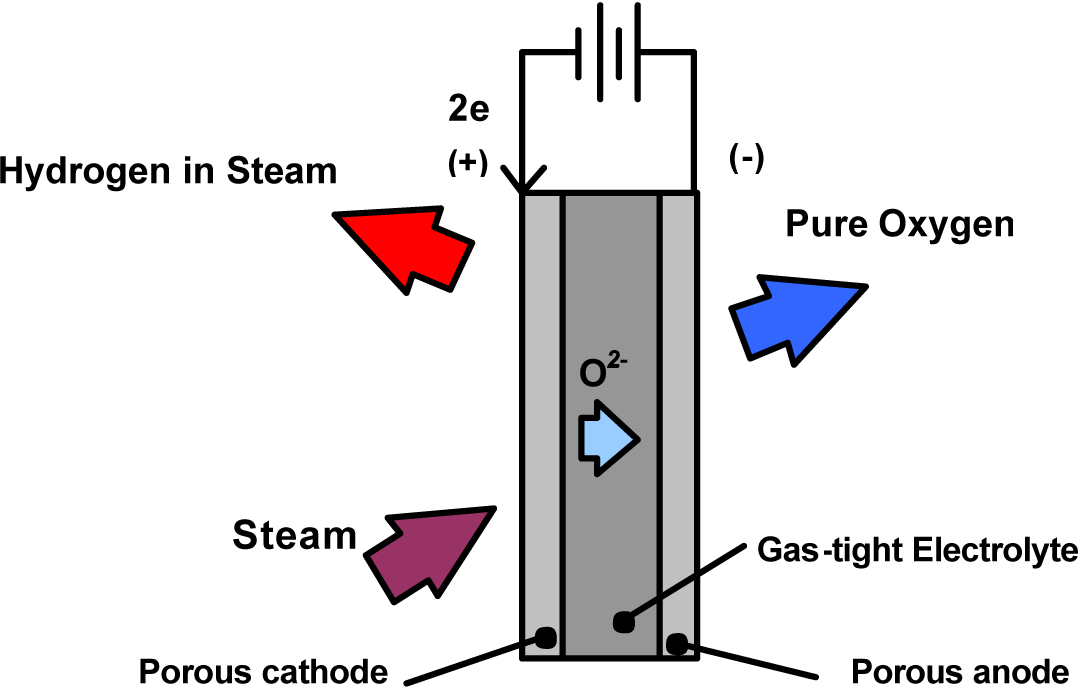
High-temperature electrolysis schema.

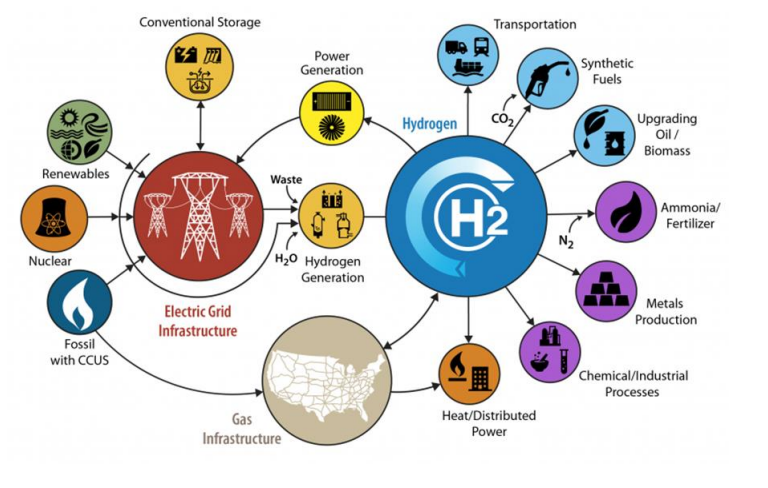
Decarbonization of Economy via hydrogen produced from HTE

High-temperature electrolysis (also HTE or steam electrolysis, or HTSE) is a technology for producing hydrogen from water at high temperatures or other products, such as iron or carbon nanomaterials, as higher energy lowers needed electricity to split molecules and opens up new, potentially better electrolytes like molten salts or hydroxides. Unlike electrolysis at room temperature, HTE operates at elevated temperature ranges depending on the thermal capacity of the material. Because of the detrimental effects of burning fossil fuels on humans and the environment, HTE has become a necessary alternative and efficient method by which hydrogen can be prepared on a large scale and used as fuel. The vision of HTE is to move towards decarbonization in all economic sectors. The material requirements for this process are: the heat source, the electrodes, the electrolyte, the electrolyzer membrane, and the source of electricity.

== Principle ==
The process utilizes energy (in the form of heat) from sources to convert water into steam, which is then passed into an electrolytic system (made up of two electrodes connected to the source of current, an electrolyte, and a membrane). At high temperatures (over 650 °C in most topologies), the materials used to construct the cells become conductive. Therefore, electrochemical reactions begin to occur, and the cell begins to function once it has reached the proper temperature and electricity is supplied while it is being fed with steam. The steam will eventually split into hydrogen (cathode) and oxygen (anode) according to the equations below:

$$\ce{Overall: 2H2O -> 2H2 + O2}$$
$$\ce{Cathode: 2H2O ->2H + 2OH^{-}}$$
$$\ce{Anode: 2OH^{-} ->  H2O + (1/2)O2}$$

== Efficiency ==
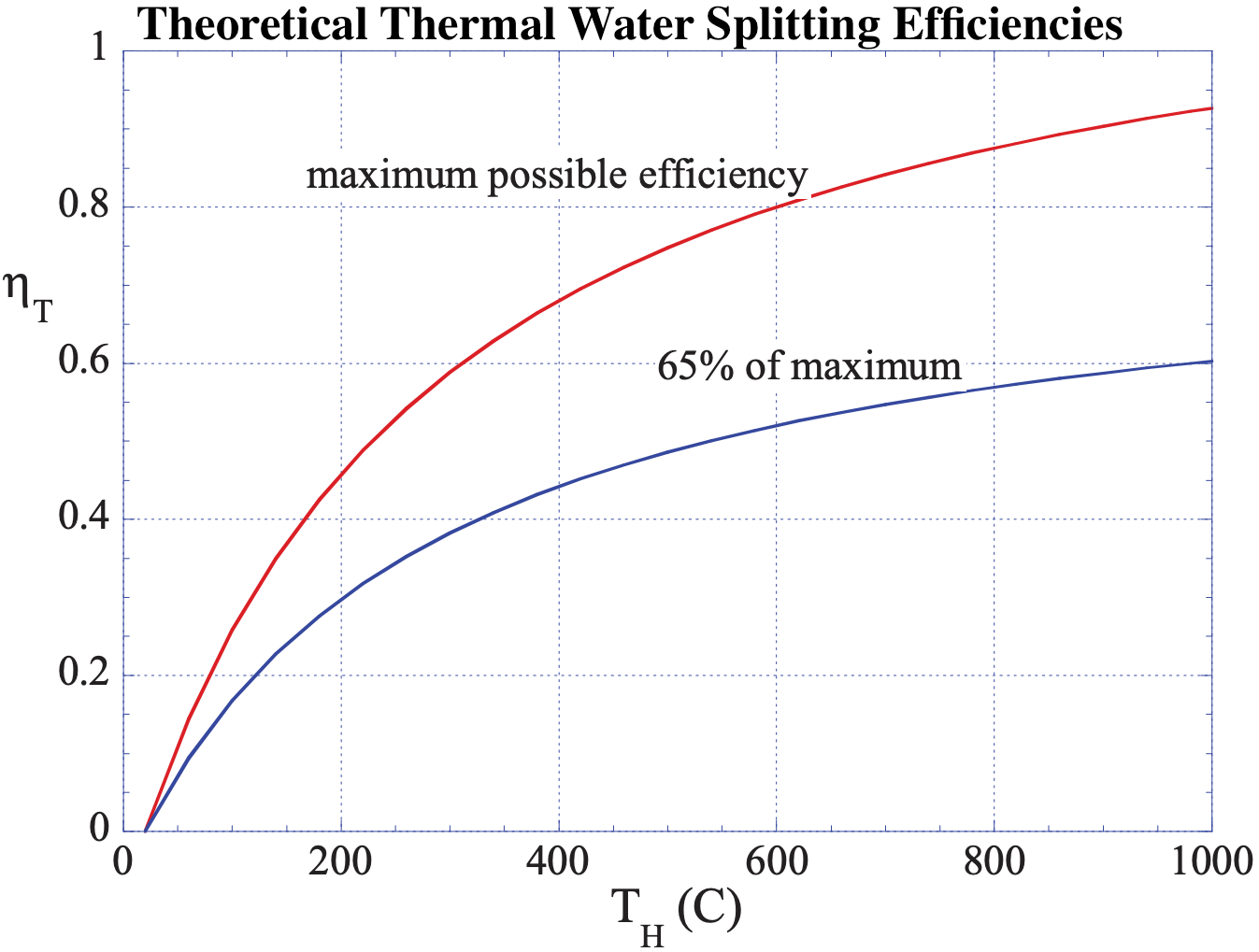
Theoretical thermal water splitting efficiencies. 60% efficient at 1000°C Steam reforming of hydrocarbons to hydrogen is 70-85% efficient

High temperature electrolysis is more efficient economically than traditional room-temperature electrolysis because some of the energy is supplied as heat, which is cheaper than electricity, and also because the electrolysis reaction is more efficient at higher temperatures. In fact, at 2500 °C, electrical input is unnecessary because water breaks down to hydrogen and oxygen through thermolysis. Such temperatures are impractical; proposed HTE systems operate between 100 °C and 850 °C.

If one assumes that the electricity used comes from a heat engine, it takes 141.86 megajoules (MJ) of heat energy to produce one kg of hydrogen, for the HTE process itself and for the electricity required. At 100 °C, 350 MJ of thermal energy are required (41% efficient). At 850 °C, 225 MJ are required (64% efficient). Above 850 °C, one begins to exceed the capacity of standard chromium steels to resist corrosion, and it's already no easy matter to design and implement an industrial scale chemical process to operate at such a high temperature point.

== Materials ==
Solid oxide electrolysis cells (SOECs) are electrochemical devices that function at high temperatures and are used for high-temperature electrolysis. These cells' ingredients ensure that the device will function well both physically and electrochemically at high temperatures. Therefore, the selection of materials for the electrodes and electrolyte in a solid oxide electrolyser cell is essential. One option being investigated for the process used yttria-stabilized zirconia (YSZ) electrolytes, Nickel (Ni)-cermet steam/Hydrogen electrodes, and d Oxide of Lanthanum oxide (La_{2}O_{3}), Strontium and Cobalt oxygen electrodes.

== Economic potential ==
Even with HTE, electrolysis is a fairly inefficient way to store energy. Significant conversion losses of energy occur both in the electrolysis process, and in the conversion of the resulting hydrogen back into power.

At current hydrocarbon prices, HTE can not compete with pyrolysis of hydrocarbons as an economical source of hydrogen, which produces carbon dioxide as a by-product.

HTE is of interest as a more efficient route to the production "green" hydrogen, to be used as a carbon neutral fuel and general energy storage. It may become economical if cheap non-fossil fuel sources of heat (concentrating solar, nuclear, geothermal, waste heat) can be used in conjunction with non-fossil fuel sources of electricity (such as solar, wind, ocean, nuclear).

Possible supplies of cheap high-temperature heat for HTE are all nonchemical, including nuclear reactors, concentrating solar thermal collectors, and geothermal sources. HTE has been demonstrated in a laboratory at 108 kilojoules (electric) per gram of hydrogen produced, but not at a commercial scale.

=== Advantages and Challenges ===
Obviously, the most notable advantage of HTE is that it provides an opportunity for which green hydrogen is prepared on a large scale, because it has the potential for zero emissions. The process provides an improved reaction kinetics for the splitting of water molecule. Part of the electricity requirement is replaced with heat, which makes it a bit cheaper because electricity is more expensive than heat.

However, HTE technology suffered limitations due to:

1. Above 100 °C, the electrolysis of liquid water requires pressurization, and is therefore limited by the working pressures that can be reasonably attained.
2. creating materials that are both chemically and physically stable in conditions of intense oxidation and reduction, as well as high working temperatures.
3. chemical and physical stability at low electrical conductivities, high working temperatures, and/or ionic concentrations.

=== Alternatives ===
There are hundreds of thermochemical cycles known to use heat to extract hydrogen from water. For instance, the thermochemical sulfur-iodine cycle. Since the electricity generation step has a fairly low efficiency and is eliminated, thermochemical production might reach higher efficiencies than HTE. However, large-scale thermochemical production will require significant advances in materials that can withstand high-temperature, high-pressure, highly corrosive environments.

== United States Department of Energy ==
The DOE has supported hydrogen demonstration projects at three nuclear power plants in the United States. The projects at Nine Mile Point and Davis–Besse use proton-exchange membrane (PEM) electrolysis, while the Prairie Island project uses solid oxide electrolysis cell (SOEC) technology.

- Nine Mile Point Nuclear Generating Station in Oswego, New York – low-temperature electrolysis.
- Davis–Besse Nuclear Power Station in Oak Harbor, Ohio – low-temperature electrolysis.
- Prairie Island Nuclear Generating Plant in Red Wing, Minnesota – high-temperature electrolysis.
- Nine Mile Point Nuclear Generating Station in Oswego, New York – low-temperature electrolysis
- Davis–Besse Nuclear Power Station in Oak Harbor, Ohio – low-temperature electrolysis
- Prairie Island Nuclear Generating Plant in Red Wing, Minnesota – high-temperature electrolysis
- Nine Mile Point Nuclear Generating Station in Oswego, NY
- Davis–Besse Nuclear Power Station in Oak Harbor, Ohio
- Prairie Island Nuclear Power Plant in Red Wing, Minnesota

== Mars ISRU ==
High temperature electrolysis with solid oxide electrolyser cells was used to produce 5.37 grams of oxygen per hour on Mars from atmospheric carbon dioxide for the Mars Oxygen ISRU Experiment in the NASA Mars 2020 Perseverance rover, using zirconia electrolysis devices.

== See also ==
- Office of Nuclear Energy
- High-pressure electrolysis
