= SOEC =

The abbreviation SOEC may refer to:

- Solid oxide electrolyser cell, a solid oxide fuel cell in regenerative mode.
- South Okanagan Events Centre, an indoor arena in Penticton, British Columbia.
