= High-pressure electrolysis =

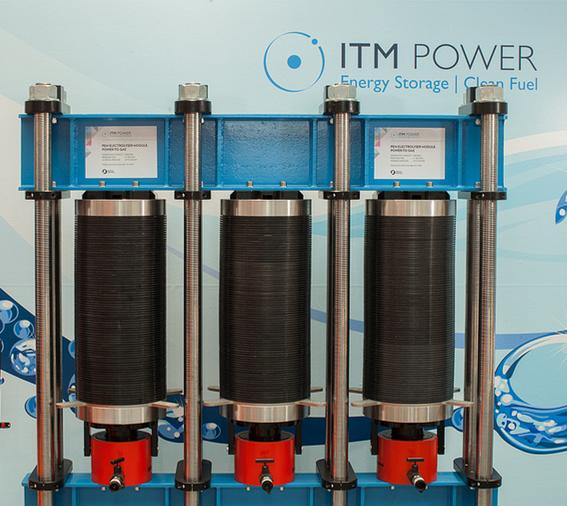
ITM Power's HGas electrolyser stacks, each operating at 80bar pressure

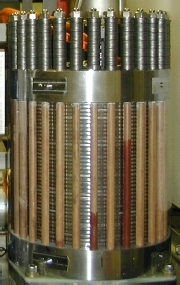
High-pressure PEM electrolyser.

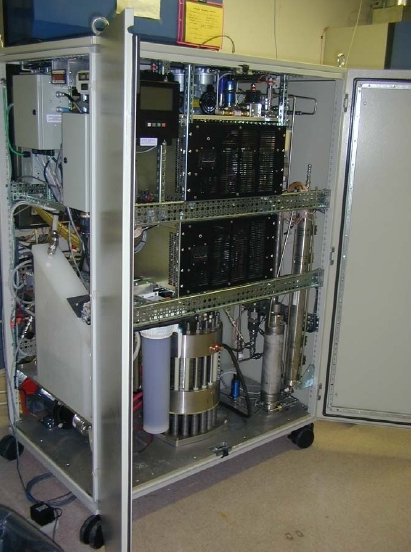

High-pressure electrolysis (HPE) is the electrolysis of water by decomposition of water (H_{2}O) into oxygen (O_{2}) and hydrogen gas (H_{2}) due to the passing of an electric current through the water. The difference with a standard proton exchange membrane (PEM) electrolyzer is the compressed hydrogen output around 12–20 megapascals (120–200 bar) at 70 °C. By pressurising the hydrogen in the electrolyser the need for an external hydrogen compressor is eliminated, the average energy consumption for internal differential pressure compression is around 3%.

== Approaches ==
As the required compression power for water is less than that for hydrogen-gas the water is pumped up to a high-pressure, in the other approach differential pressure is used. There is also an importance for the electrolyser stacks to be able to accept a fluctuating electrical input, such as that found with renewable energy. This then enables the ability to help with grid balancing and energy storage.

== Ultrahigh-pressure electrolysis ==
Ultrahigh-pressure electrolysis is high-pressure electrolysis operating at 340–690 bars (5,000–10,000 psi). At ultra-high pressures the water solubility and cross-permeation across the membrane of H_{2} and O_{2} is affecting hydrogen purity, modified PEMs are used to reduce cross-permeation in combination with catalytic H_{2}/O_{2} recombiners to maintain H_{2} levels in O_{2} and O_{2} levels in H_{2} at values compatible with hydrogen safety requirements.

== Research ==
The US DOE believes that high-pressure electrolysis, supported by ongoing research and development, will contribute to the enabling and acceptance of technologies where hydrogen is the energy carrier between renewable energy resources and clean energy consumers.

High-pressure electrolysis is being investigated by the DOE for efficient production of hydrogen from water. The target total in 2005 is $4.75 per gge H_{2} at an efficiency of 64%. The total goal for the DOE in 2010 is $2.85 per gge H_{2} at an efficiency of 75%. As of 2005 the DOE provided a total of $1,563,882 worth of funding for research.

Mitsubishi is pursuing such technology with its High-pressure hydrogen energy generator (HHEG) project.

The Forschungszentrum Jülich, in Jülich Germany is currently researching the cost reduction of components used in high-pressure PEM electrolysis in the EKOLYSER project. The primary goal of this research is to improve performance and gas purity, reduce cost and volume of expensive materials and reach the alternative energy targets set forth by the German government for 2050 in the Energy Concept published in 2010.

ThalesNano Energy released a lab-scale high pressure (100 bar) hydrogen generator as a replacement for hydrogen cylinders in chemistry laboratories.

== Commercial Products ==
Honda installed its Smart Hydrogen Station (SHS) in Los Angeles for use by fuel cell automobiles.

== See also ==
- Regenerative fuel cell
- Electrochemical engineering
- High-temperature electrolysis
