= Ion-exchange membrane =

Type of semi-permeable membrane

An ion-exchange membrane is a semi-permeable membrane that transports certain dissolved ions, while blocking other ions or neutral molecules.

Ion-exchange membranes are therefore electrically conductive. They are often used in desalination and chemical recovery applications, moving ions from one solution to another with little passage of water.

Important examples of ion-exchange membranes include the proton-exchange membranes, that transport H^{+} cations, and the anion exchange membranes used in certain alkaline fuel cells to transport OH^{−} anions.

== Structure and composition ==
An ion-exchange membrane is generally made of organic or inorganic polymer with charged (ionic) side groups, such as ion-exchange resins. Anion-exchange membranes contain fixed cationic groups with predominantly mobile anions; because anions are the majority species, most of the conductivity is due to anion transport. The reverse holds for cation-exchange membranes.

The so-called heterogeneous ion-exchange membranes have low cost and a thicker composition with higher resistance and a rough surface that can be subject to fouling. Homogeneous membranes are more expensive, but have a thinner composition with lower resistance and a smooth surface, less susceptible to fouling. Homogeneous membrane surfaces can be modified to alter the membrane permselectivity to protons, monovalent ions, and divalent ions.

== Selectivity ==
The selectivity of an ion-exchange membrane is due to Gibbs-Donnan equilibrium and not due to physically blocking or electrostatically excluding specific charged species.

The selectivity to the transport of ions of opposite charges is called its permselectivity.

== Applications ==
Ion-exchange membranes are traditionally used in electrodialysis or diffusion dialysis by means of an electrical potential or concentration gradient, respectively, to selectively transport cationic and anionic species. When applied in an electrodialysis desalination process, anion- and cation-exchange membranes are typically arranged in an alternating pattern between two electrodes (an anode and a cathode) within the electrodialysis stack. A galvanic potential is supplied as a voltage generated at the electrodes.

A typical industrial electrodialysis stack consists of two chambers: a product-water chamber and a concentrate-reject chamber. During stack operation, salts are transferred from the product to the concentrate. As a result, the reject stream is concentrated up while the product stream is desalted.

Exemplary applications of ion-exchange membranes utilized in electrodialysis and EDR include seawater desalination, industrial wastewater treatment of highly scaling waters, food and beverage production, and other industrial wastewaters.

== See also ==
- Proton-exchange membrane
