= Alkaline water electrolysis =

Type of electrolyzer

Typical Materials
- Type of Electrolysis: Alkaline Water Electrolysis
- Style of membrane/diaphragm: NiO/polysulfone matrix and ZrO2 (Zirfon)/polyphenil sulfide
- Bipolar/separator plate material: Stainless steel
- Catalyst material on the anode: Ni/Co/Fe
- Catalyst material on the cathode: Ni/C-Pt
- Anode PTL material: Ti/Ni/zirconium
- Cathode PTL material: Stainless steel mesh

State-of-the-art Operating Ranges
- Cell temperature: 60-80 °C
- Stack pressure: <30 bar
- Current density: 0.2-0.4 A/cm^{2}
- Cell voltage: 1.8-2.40 V
- Power density: to 1.0 W/cm^{2}
- Part-load range: 20-40%
- Specific energy consumption stack: 4.2-5.9 kWh/Nm^{3}
- Specific energy consumption system: 4.5-7.0 kWh/Nm^{3}
- Cell voltage efficiency: 62–82% (HHV)
- System hydrogen production rate: <760 Nm^{3}/h
- Lifetime stack: <90,000 h
- Acceptable degradation rate: <3 μV/h
- System lifetime: 20-30 years

Alkaline water electrolysis is a type of electrolysis that is characterized by having two electrodes operating in a liquid alkaline electrolyte. Commonly, a solution of potassium hydroxide (KOH) or sodium hydroxide (NaOH) at 25-40 wt% is used. These electrodes are separated by a diaphragm, separating the product gases and transporting the hydroxide ions (OH^{−}) from one electrode to the other. A recent comparison showed that state-of-the-art nickel based water electrolysers with alkaline electrolytes lead to competitive or even better efficiencies than acidic polymer electrolyte membrane water electrolysis with platinum group metal based electrocatalysts.

The technology has a long history in the chemical industry. The first large-scale demand for hydrogen emerged in late 19th century for lighter-than-air aircraft, and before the advent of steam reforming in the 1930s, the technique was competitive.

Hydrogen-based technologies have evolved significantly since the initial discovery of hydrogen and its early application as a buoyant gas approximately 250 years ago. In 1804, the Swiss inventor Francois Isaac de Rivaz secured a patent for the inaugural hydrogen-powered vehicle. This prototype, equipped with a four-wheel design, utilised an internal combustion engine (ICE) fuelled by a mixture of hydrogen and oxygen gases. The hydrogen fuel was stored in a balloon, and ignition was achieved through an electrical starter known as a Volta starter. The combustion process propelled the piston within the cylinder, which, upon descending, activated a wheel through a ratchet mechanism. This invention could be viewed as an early embodiment of a system comprising hydrogen storage, conduits, valves, and a conversion device.

Approximately four decades after the military scientist Ritter developed the first electrolyser, the chemists Schoenbein and Sir Grove independently identified and showcased the fuel cell concept. This technology operates in reverse to electrolysis around the year 1839. This discovery marked a significant milestone in the field of hydrogen technology, demonstrating the potential for hydrogen as a source of clean energy.

== Structure and materials ==
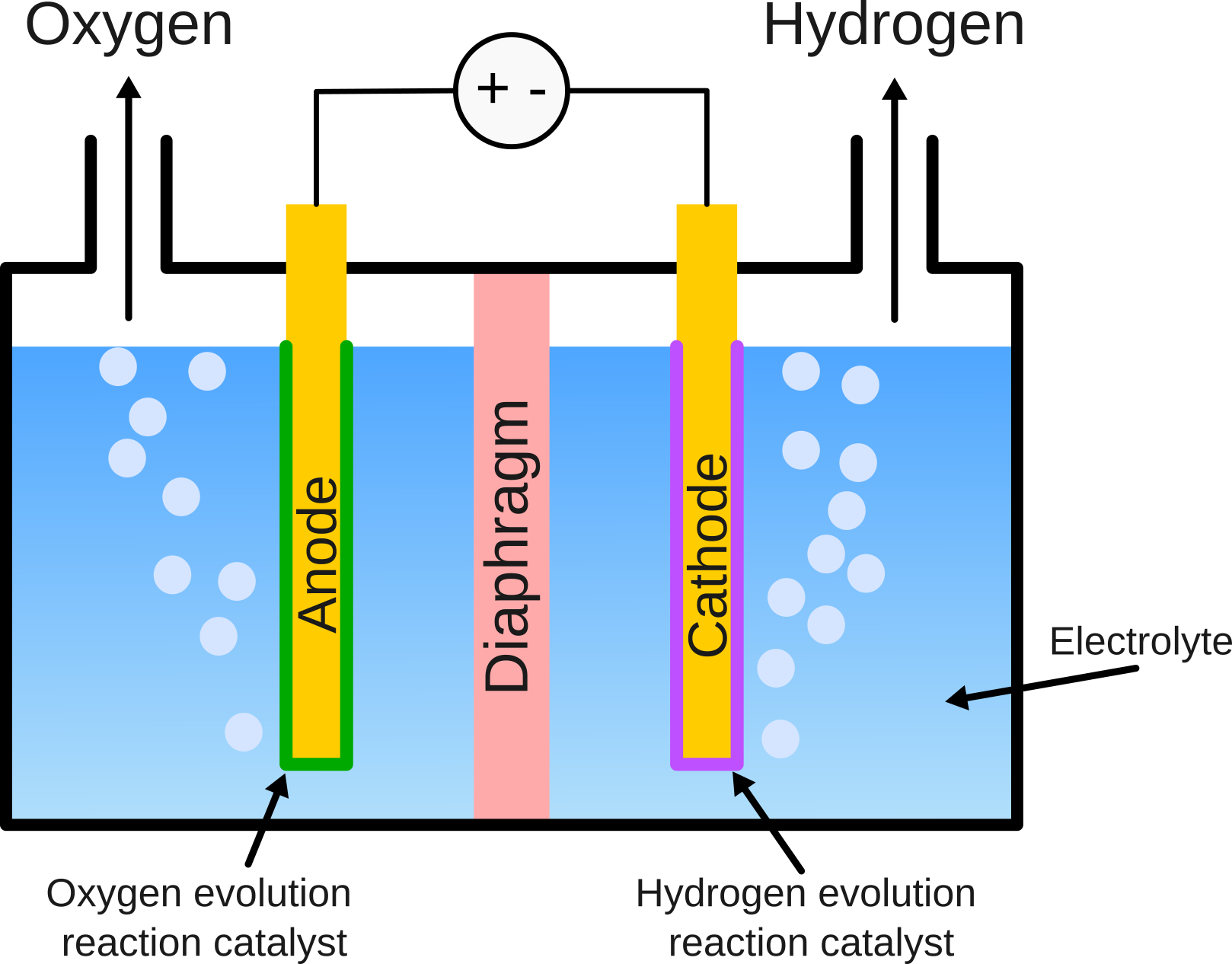
Scheme of alkaline water electrolyzers. The catalysts are added to the anode and cathode to reduce the overpotential.

The electrodes are typically separated by a thin porous foil, commonly referred to as diaphragm or separator. The diaphragm is non-conductive to electrons, thus avoiding electrical shorts between the electrodes while allowing small distances between the electrodes. The ionic conductivity is supplied by the aqueous alkaline solution, which penetrates in the pores of the diaphragm. Asbestos diaphragms have been used for a long time due to their effective gas separation, low cost, and high chemical stability; however, their use is restricted by the Rotterdam Convention. The state-of-the-art diaphragm is Zirfon, a composite material of zirconia and Polysulfone. The diaphragm further avoids the mixing of the produced hydrogen and oxygen at the cathode and anode, respectively. The thickness of asbestos diaphragms ranges from 2 to 5 mm, while Zirfon diaphragms range from 0.2 to 0.5 mm.

Typically, nickel based metals are used as the electrodes for alkaline water electrolysis. Considering pure metals, Ni is the least active non-noble metal. The high price of good noble metal electrocatalysts such as platinum group metals and their dissolution during the oxygen evolution is a drawback. Ni is considered as more stable during the oxygen evolution, but stainless steel has shown good stability and better catalytic activity than Ni at high temperatures during the Oxygen Evolution Reaction (OER).

High surface area Ni catalysts can be achieved by dealloying of nickel-zinc or nickel-aluminium alloys in alkaline solution, commonly referred to as Raney nickel. In cell tests the best performing electrodes thus far reported consisted of plasma vacuum sprayed Ni alloys on Ni meshes and hot dip galvanized Ni meshes. The latter approach might be interesting for large scale industrial manufacturing as it is cheap and easily scalable, but unfortunately, all the strategies show some degradation.

== Electrochemistry ==
=== Anode reaction ===
In alkaline media oxygen evolution reactions, multiple adsorbent species (O, OH, OOH, and OO^{–}) and multiple steps are involved. Steps 4 and 5 often occur in a single step, but there is evidence that suggests steps 4 and 5 occur separately at pH 11 and higher.

$\mathrm{OH}^- \rightarrow \mathrm{OH}^* + \mathrm{e}^-$	$\left ( 1 \right )$

$\mathrm{OH}^* + \mathrm{OH}^- \rightarrow \mathrm{O}^* + \mathrm{H}_2 \mathrm{O} + \mathrm{e}^-$	$\left ( 2 \right )$

$\mathrm{O}^* + \mathrm{OH}^- \rightarrow \mathrm{OOH}^* + \mathrm{e}^-$	$\left ( 3 \right )$

$\mathrm{OOH}^* + \mathrm{OH}^- \rightarrow \mathrm{OO}^{-*} + \mathrm{H}_2 \mathrm{O}$	$\left ( 4 \right )$

$\mathrm{OO}^{-*} \rightarrow \mathrm{O}_{2(g)} + \mathrm{e}^-$	$\left ( 5 \right )$

Overall anode reaction: $2\mathrm{OH}^- \rightarrow \mathrm{H}_2 \mathrm{O} + \frac{1}{2}\mathrm{O}_2 + 2 \mathrm{e}^- \quad (E^0 = + 0.40 \, \mathrm{V \; vs. \; SHE})$

$\left ( 6 \right )$

Where the * indicate species adsorbed to the surface of the catalyst.

=== Cathode reaction ===
The hydrogen evolution reaction in alkaline conditions starts with water adsorption and dissociation in the Volmer step and either hydrogen desorption in the Tafel step or Heyrovsky step.

Volmer step: $2\mathrm{H}_2 \mathrm{O} + 2\mathrm{e}^- \rightarrow 2\mathrm{H}^* + 2\mathrm{OH}^{-}$	$\left ( 7 \right )$

Tafel step: $2\mathrm{H}^* \rightarrow \mathrm{H}_2$	$\left ( 8 \right )$

Heyrovsky step: $\mathrm{H}_2 \mathrm{O} + \mathrm{H}^* + \mathrm{e}^- \rightarrow \mathrm{H}_2 + \mathrm{OH}^-$

$\left ( 9 \right )$

Overall cathode reaction: $2\mathrm{H}_2 \mathrm{O} + 2\mathrm{e}^- \rightarrow \mathrm{H}_2 + 2\mathrm{OH}^- \quad (E^0 = - 0.83 \, \mathrm{V \; vs. \; SHE})$

$\left ( 10 \right )$

== Advantages compared to PEM water electrolysis ==
In comparison to Proton exchange membrane electrolysis, the advantages of alkaline water electrolysis are mainly:

1. Has a longer track record of industrial use, proven reliability, and lower initial costs, making it a more mature option for large-scale hydrogen production.
2. Higher durability due to an exchangeable electrolyte and lower dissolution of anodic catalyst.
3. Unlike PEM electrolysis, alkaline electrolysis does not require expensive or scarce precious metals like platinum or iridium for the electrodes. This reduces the overall cost and material dependencies.

== Disadvantage ==
One disadvantage of alkaline water electrolysers is the low-performance profiles caused by the commonly used thick diaphragms that increase ohmic resistance, the lower intrinsic conductivity of OH− compared to H+, and the higher gas crossover observed for highly porous diaphragms.

== See also ==
- Proton exchange membrane electrolysis
- Solid oxide electrolyzer cell
- Anion exchange membrane electrolysis
