= Trimolybdenum phosphide =

Identifiers
3D model (JSmol)	Interactive image
- InChI: InChI=1S/3Mo.H2P/h;;;1H2 Key: OAPJTDUVZFSGNK-UHFFFAOYSA-N
- SMILES: [P].[Mo].[Mo].[Mo]

Properties
Chemical formula	Mo_{3}P
Molar mass	318.82 g·mol^{−1}
Appearance	grey crystals
Solubility in water	insoluble

Related compounds
Related compounds	Molybdenum monophosphide, Molybdenum diphosphide
- Except where otherwise noted, data are given for materials in their standard state (at 25 °C [77 °F], 100 kPa). Infobox references

Trimolybdenum phosphide is a binary inorganic compound of molybdenum metal and phosphorus with the chemical formula Mo_{3}P.

== Preparation ==
Trimolybdenum phosphide can be obtained via electrolysis of a melt mixture of molybdenum hexametaphosphate with molybdenum(VI) oxide and sodium chloride.

== Properties ==
Trimolybdenum phosphide forms grey crystals of tetragonal crystal system with space group I4. It is insoluble in water. Trimolybdenum phosphide becomes superconducting at 7 K.

== Uses ==
Trimolybdenum phosphide can be used as a catalyst for electrocatalytic processes. It can also be used in accumulators.
