= Molybdenum monophosphide =

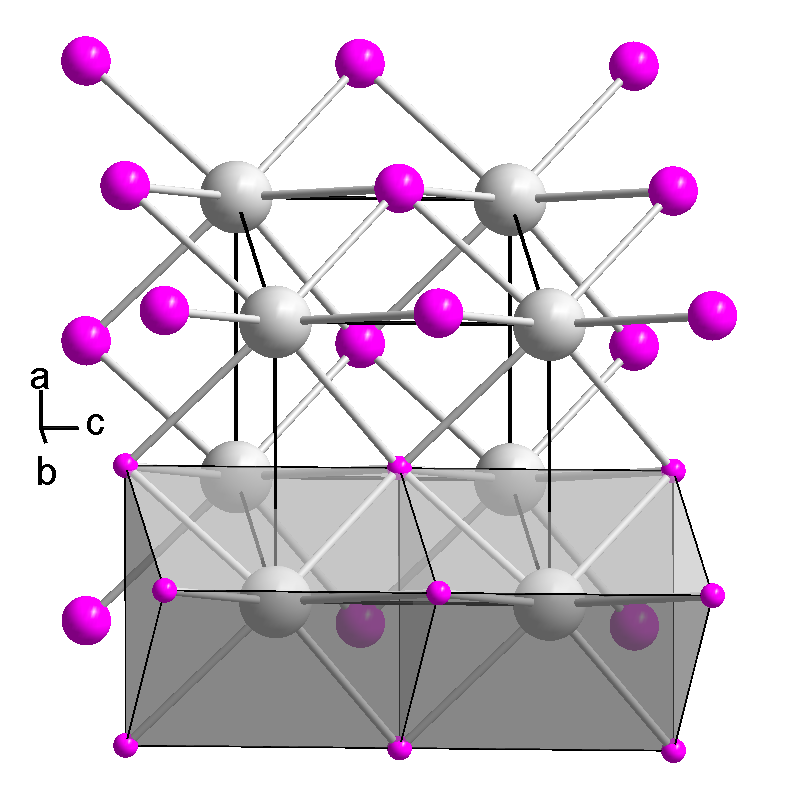

Names
- IUPAC name Phosphanylidynemolybdenum

Identifiers
CAS Number	12163-69-8
3D model (JSmol)	Interactive image
ChemSpider	74851
ECHA InfoCard	100.032.090
EC Number	235-312-8
PubChem CID	134067814
CompTox Dashboard (EPA)	DTXSID30923899
- InChI: InChI=1S/Mo.P Key: AMWVZPDSWLOFKA-UHFFFAOYSA-N
- SMILES: [Mo]#P

Properties
Chemical formula	MoP
Molar mass	126.92 g·mol^{−1}
Appearance	black crystals
Density	7.34 g/cm^{3}
Solubility in water	insoluble

Hazards
- GHS labelling
Pictograms	(GHS07: Exclamation mark)
Signal word	Warning
Hazard statements	H319, H335
Precautionary statements	P261, P280, P304, P305, P338, P340, P351, P405, P501

Related compounds
Related compounds	Trimolybdenum phosphide, molybdenum diphosphide
- Except where otherwise noted, data are given for materials in their standard state (at 25 °C [77 °F], 100 kPa). Infobox references

Molybdenum monophosphide is a binary inorganic compound of molybdenum metal and phosphorus with the chemical formula MoP.

== Preparation ==
Molybdenum monophosphide can be obtained from electrolysis of molten molybdenum hexametaphosphate:

4 Mo(PO_{3})_{6} → 4 MoP + 10 P_{2}O_{5} + 9 O_{2}

It can also be prepared from heating of a mixture of molybdenum and metaphosphoric acid in a carbon crucible:

2 Mo + 2 HPO_{3} + 5 C → 2 MoP + 5 CO + H_{2}O

Other reactions are known too.

== Properties ==
Molybdenum monophosphide forms black crystals of hexagonal crystal system with space group P6m2. It is insoluble in water. Molybdenum monophosphide decomposes when heated in air:

4 MoP + 11 O_{2} → 4 MoO_{3} + 2 P_{2}O_{5}

== Uses ==
Molybdenum monophosphide can be used as a catalyst.
