= Hydrogen purification =

Technology for purifying hydrogen

Hydrogen purification is any technology used to purify hydrogen. The impurities in hydrogen gas depend on the source of the H2, e.g., petroleum, coal, electrolysis, etc. The required purity is determined by the application of the hydrogen gas. For example, ultra-high purified hydrogen is needed for applications like proton exchange membrane fuel cells.

== Purification technologies ==
=== Low temperature methods ===
The default large-scale purification of H_{2} produced in oil refineries exploits its very low boiling point of −253 °C. Most impurities have boiling points well above this temperature. Low temperature methods can be complemented by scrubbing to remove particular impurities.

=== Palladium membrane hydrogen purifiers ===
Hydrogen can be purified by passing through a membrane composed of palladium and silver. Permeability of the former to hydrogen was discovered back in the 1860s. An alloy with a ca. 3:1 ratio for Pd:Ag is more structural robust than pure Pd, which is the active component that allows the selective diffusion of H_{2} through it. Diffusion is faster near 300 °C. This method has been used for purification of hydrogen on a laboratory scale, but not in industry. Silver-palladium membranes are unstable toward alkenes and sulfur-containing compounds.

Dense thin-metal membrane purifiers are compact, relatively inexpensive and simple to use.

=== Pressure swing adsorption ===
Pressure swing adsorption is used for the removal of carbon dioxide (CO_{2}) as the final step in the large-scale commercial synthesis of hydrogen. It can also remove methane, carbon monoxide, nitrogen, moisture and in some cases, argon, from hydrogen.

== Applications ==
=== Metalorganic vapour phase epitaxy ===
Hydrogen purifiers are used in metalorganic vapour phase epitaxy reactors for LED production.

=== PEM fuel cells ===
Fuel cell electric vehicles commonly use polymer electrolyte membrane fuel cells (PEMFC) that are susceptible to a range of impurities. Impurities impact PEMFC using a range of mechanisms, these may include poisoning the anode hydrogen oxidation reaction catalysts, reducing the ionic conductivity of the ionomer and membrane, altering wetting behaviour of components or blocking porosity in diffusion media. The impact of some impurities like carbon monoxide, formic acid, or formaldehyde is reversible with PEMFC performance recovering once the supply of impurity is removed. Other impurities, for example sulphurous compounds, may cause irreversible degradation. The permissible limits of hydrogen impurities are shown below.

Fuel Quality Specification For Gasseous Hydrogen Supplied to PEMFC Road Vehicles
	Maximum Permissible Concentration / μmol mol^{−1}
Total non-hydrogen gasses	300
Water	5
Total Hydrocarbons Except Methane [Carbon atom basis]	2
Methane	100
Oxygen	5
Helium	300
Nitrogen	300
Argon	300
Carbon Dioxide	2
Carbon Monoxide	0.2
Total Sulphur Compounds [Sulphur atom basis]	0.004
Formaldehyde	0.2
Formic Acid	0.2
Ammonia	0.1
Halogenated Compounds [Halogen ion basis]	0.05
Maximum Particulate Concentration	1 mg kg^{−1}

Efforts to assess the compliance of hydrogen supplied by hydrogen refuelling stations against the ISO-14687 standard have been performed. While the hydrogen was generally found to be 'good' violations of the standard have been reported, most frequently for nitrogen, water and oxygen.

=== Combustion engines and appliances ===
Combustion applications are generally more tolerant of hydrogen impurities than PEFMC, as such the ISO-14687 standard for permissible impurities is less strict. This standard has itself been criticised with revisions proposed to make it more lenient and therefore suitable for hydrogen distributed through a repurposed gas network.

Fuel Quality Specification For Gaseous Hydrogen Supplied to Combustion Engines and Appliances
Impurity	Maximum Permissible Concentration / μmol mol^{−1}
Total non-hydrogen gasses	20 000
Water	Non-condensing
Total Hydrocarbons [Carbon atom basis]	100
Carbon Monoxide	1
Sulphur [Sulphur atom basis]	2
Combined water, oxygen, nitrogen, argon	19 000
Permanent Particulates	Shall not contain an amount sufficient to cause damage.

== Sources of impurities ==
The presence of impurities in hydrogen depends on the feedstock and the production process. Hydrogen produced by electrolysis of water may routinely include trace oxygen and water. Hydrogen produced by reforming of hydrocarbons contains carbon dioxide and carbon monoxide as well as sulphur compounds. Some impurities may be added deliberately, for example odorants to aid detection of gas leaks.

== Methods for analysis ==
As the permissible concentrations for many impurities are very low this sets stringent demands on the sensitivity of the analytical methods. Moreover, the high reactivity of some impurities requires use of a properly passivated sampling and analytical systems. Sampling of hydrogen of is challenging and care must be taken to ensure that impurities are not introduced to the sample and that impurities do not absorb on or react within the sampling equipment, there are currently different methods for sampling but rely on filling a gas cylinder from the refuelling nozzle of a refuelling station. Efforts are underway to standardise and compare sampling strategies. A combination of different instruments is needed to assess hydrogen samples for all of the components listed in ISO 14687-2. Techniques suitable for individual impurities are indicated in the table below.

Example Analytical Methods for Assessing The Concentration of Impurities in Hydrogen
Impurity	Possible Analytical Methods	Detection Limits
Total non-hydrogen gasses		
Water	Quartz crystal microbalance or CRDS	1.3 or 0.030
Total Hydrocarbons Except Methane [Carbon atom basis]	GC-Methaniser-FID	0.1
Methane	GC-Methaniser-FID, GC-EPD	0.1
Oxygen	GC-PDHID, GC-EPD	0.3
Helium	GC-TCD	10
Nitrogen	GC-PDHID, GC-EPD	1
Argon	GC-PDHID, GC-EPD	0.3
Carbon Dioxide	GC-Methaniser-FID, GC-EPD	0.02
Carbon Monoxide	GC-Methaniser-FID, GC-EPD	0.02
Total Sulphur Compounds [Sulphur atom basis]	GC-SCD, GC-EPD	0.001
Formaldehyde	GC-Methaniser-FID	0.1
Formic Acid	FTIR	0.2
Ammonia	GC-MS or UV-visible spectroscopy or FTIR	1 or 0.03 or 0.1
Halogenated Compounds (Halogen Ion Equivalent)	TD-GC-MS	0.016

Techniques such as electrochemical sensors and mass spectrometry.

== See also ==
- Gas separation
- Hydrogen pinch
- Membrane gas separation
- Membrane reactor
- 45 Home Power #67 • October / November 1998 (home electrolyzers)
- Hydrogen station
- Hydrogen fuel
- Proton-exchange membrane fuel cell
- MetroHyVe2 Project
- Hydraite Project
- National Physical Laboratory Hydrogen Purity
