= Molybdenum diphosphide =

Identifiers
3D model (JSmol)	Interactive image
- InChI: InChI=1S/Mo.2P Key: YDGMHDVXDKIUNP-UHFFFAOYSA-N
- SMILES: [Mo].[P].[P]

Properties
Chemical formula	MoP_{2}
Molar mass	157.90 g·mol^{−1}
Appearance	black crystals
Density	5.35 g/cm^{3}
Solubility in water	insoluble

Related compounds
Related compounds	Molybdenum monophosphide, Trimolybdenum phosphide
- Except where otherwise noted, data are given for materials in their standard state (at 25 °C [77 °F], 100 kPa). Infobox references

Molybdenum diphosphide is a binary inorganic compound of molybdenum metal and phosphorus with the chemical formula MoP_{2}.

== Synthesis ==
Molybdenum diphosphide can be obtained by heating molybdenum with red phosphorus in a closed tube at 550 °C:

Mo + 2P → MoP_{2}

== Properties ==
Molybdenum diphosphide forms black crystals of orthorhombic crystal system with space group A2_{1}am. It is insoluble in water. It decomposes when heated, releasing molybdenum monophosphide and white phosphorus:

4MoP_{2} → 4MoP + P_{4}

== Uses ==
Molybdenum diphosphide can be used as a catalyst.
