= Proton-exchange membrane =

Ion-exchange membrane specific for protons

A proton-exchange membrane, or polymer-electrolyte membrane (PEM), is a semipermeable membrane generally made from ionomers and designed to conduct protons while acting as an electronic insulator and reactant barrier, e.g. to oxygen and hydrogen gas. This is their essential function when incorporated into a membrane electrode assembly (MEA) of a proton-exchange membrane fuel cell or of a proton-exchange membrane electrolyser: separation of reactants and transport of protons while blocking a direct electronic pathway through the membrane.

PEMs can be made from either pure polymer membranes or from composite membranes, where other materials are embedded in a polymer matrix. One of the most common and commercially available PEM materials is the fluoropolymer (PFSA) Nafion, a DuPont product. While Nafion is an ionomer with a perfluorinated backbone like Teflon, there are many other structural motifs used to make ionomers for proton-exchange membranes. Many use polyaromatic polymers, while others use partially fluorinated polymers.

Proton-exchange membranes are primarily characterized by proton conductivity (σ), methanol permeability (P), and thermal stability.

PEM fuel cells use a solid polymer membrane (a thin plastic film) which is permeable to protons when it is saturated with water, but it does not conduct electrons.

== History ==
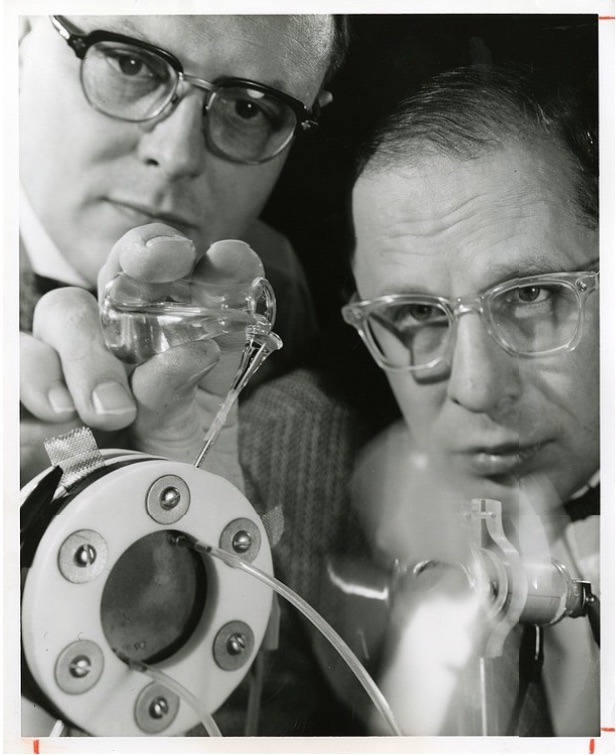
Leonard Niedrach (left) and Thomas Grubb (right), inventors of proton-exchange membrane technology.

Early proton-exchange membrane technology was developed in the early 1960s by Leonard Niedrach and Thomas Grubb, chemists working for the General Electric Company. Significant government resources were devoted to the study and development of these membranes for use in NASA's Project Gemini spaceflight program. A number of technical problems led NASA to forego the use of proton-exchange membrane fuel cells in favor of batteries as a lower capacity but more reliable alternative for Gemini missions 1–4. An improved generation of General Electric's PEM fuel cell was used in all subsequent Gemini missions, but was abandoned for the subsequent Apollo missions. The fluorinated ionomer Nafion, which is today the most widely utilized proton-exchange membrane material, was developed by DuPont plastics chemist Walther Grot. Grot also demonstrated its usefulness as an electrochemical separator membrane.

In 2014, Andre Geim of the University of Manchester published initial results on atom thick monolayers of graphene and boron nitride which allowed only protons to pass through the material, making them a potential replacement for fluorinated ionomers as a PEM material.

== Fuel cell ==
PEMFCs have some advantages over other types of fuel cells such as solid oxide fuel cells (SOFC). PEMFCs operate at a lower temperature, are lighter and more compact, which makes them ideal for applications such as cars. However, some disadvantages are: the ~80 °C operating temperature is too low for cogeneration like in SOFCs, and that the electrolyte for PEMFCs must be water-saturated. However, some fuel-cell cars, including the Toyota Mirai, operate without humidifiers, relying on rapid water generation and the high rate of back-diffusion through thin membranes to maintain the hydration of the membrane, as well as the ionomer in the catalyst layers.

High-temperature PEMFCs operate between 100 °C and 200 °C, potentially offering benefits in electrode kinetics and heat management, and better tolerance to fuel impurities, particularly CO in reformate. These improvements potentially could lead to higher overall system efficiencies. However, these gains have yet to be realized, as the gold-standard perfluorinated sulfonic acid (PFSA) membranes lose function rapidly at 100 °C and above if hydration drops below ~100%, and begin to creep in this temperature range, resulting in localized thinning and overall lower system lifetimes. As a result, new anhydrous proton conductors, such as protic organic ionic plastic crystals (POIPCs) and protic ionic liquids, are actively studied for the development of suitable PEMs.

The fuel for the PEMFC is hydrogen, and the charge carrier is the hydrogen ion (proton). At the anode, the hydrogen molecule is split into hydrogen ions (protons) and electrons. The hydrogen ions permeate across the electrolyte to the cathode, while the electrons flow through an external circuit and produce electric power. Oxygen, usually in the form of air, is supplied to the cathode and combines with the electrons and the hydrogen ions to produce water. The reactions at the electrodes are as follows:

Anode reaction:

2H_{2} → 4H^{+} + 4e^{−}

Cathode reaction:

O_{2} + 4H^{+} + 4e^{−} → 2H_{2}O

Overall cell reaction:

2H_{2} + O_{2} → 2H_{2}O + heat + electrical energy

The theoretical exothermic potential is +1.23 V overall.

== Applications ==
The primary application of proton-exchange membranes is in PEM fuel cells. These fuel cells have a wide variety of commercial and military applications including in the aerospace, automotive, and energy industries.

Early PEM fuel cell applications were focused within the aerospace industry. The then-higher capacity of fuel cells compared to batteries made them ideal as NASA's Project Gemini began to target longer duration space missions than had previously been attempted.

As of 2008, the automotive industry as well as personal and public power generation are the largest markets for proton-exchange membrane fuel cells. PEM fuel cells are popular in automotive applications due to their relatively low operating temperature and their ability to start up quickly even in below-freezing conditions. As of March 2019 there were 6,558 fuel cell vehicles on the road in the United States, with the Toyota Mirai being the most popular model. PEM fuel cells have seen successful implementation in other forms of heavy machinery as well, with Ballard Power Systems supplying forklifts based on the technology. The primary challenge facing automotive PEM technology is the safe and efficient storage of hydrogen, currently an area of high research activity.

Polymer electrolyte membrane electrolysis is a technique by which proton-exchange membranes are used to decompose water into hydrogen and oxygen gas. The proton-exchange membrane allows for the separation of produced hydrogen from oxygen, allowing either product to be exploited as needed. This process has been used variously to generate hydrogen fuel and oxygen for life-support systems in vessels such as US and Royal Navy submarines. A recent example is the construction of a 20 MW Air Liquide PEM electrolyzer plant in Québec. Similar PEM-based devices are available for the industrial production of ozone.

Johnson thermoelectric energy converter or JTEC is a type of solid-state heat engine that uses the electrochemical oxidation and reduction of hydrogen in a two-cell, thermal cycle that approximates the Ericsson cycle. The engine consists of two stages: A low-temperature compression stage and a high-temperature power stage. Each stage consists of a chamber of working fluid (in this case hydrogen) bisected by a copper lined membrane electrode assembly (MEA) made of proprietary ceramic PEM that is sandwiched between two electrodes.

== See also ==
- Alkali anion exchange membrane
- Artificial membrane
- Dry electrolyte
- Dynamic mechanical analysis
- Electrolysis of water
- Electroosmotic pump
- Gas diffusion electrode
- Isotope electrochemistry
- Membrane electrode assembly
- Proton exchange membrane electrolysis
- Roll-to-roll
