= Gas cracker =

Device used to split molecules

A gas cracker is any device that splits the molecules in a gas or liquid, usually by electrolysis, into atoms. The end product is usually a gas. A hydrocracker is an example of a gas cracker. In nature, molecules are split often, such as in food digestion and microbial digestion activity. A gas cracker device splits the molecule at a rate much greater than that normally found in nature. In science and industry, gas crackers are used to separate two or more elements in a molecule. For example, liquid water, or H_{2}O, is separated into hydrogen and oxygen gases. This is not to be confused with the splitting of the nucleus (nuclear power).

== Gas cracker ==
Petrochemicals are usually manufactured in large scale from petroleum feed stocks using fluid catalytic cracking. Naphtha, natural gas, refinery off-gas and gas from cokers and thermal crackers are good sources. Thus natural gas is one of the most wanted feed stocks for petrochemicals production. The thermal cracking of natural gas proceeds at very high temperature resulting in olefins (Mostly ethylene/propylene). The temperature in a gas cracker exceeds 1000°C. For ultimate decomposition of gas into elements more than 1500 °C is required. Thus, acetylene/carbon black production encounters such high temperatures. Usually oxy-combustion methods are used for attaining such high temperatures. BASF burners/Kellog burners are available in the market.

== Other methods ==
Further electro cracking or plasma cracking methods are also available.
