= Thermoneutral voltage =

In electrochemistry, a thermoneutral voltage is a voltage drop across an electrochemical cell which is sufficient not only to drive the cell reaction, but to also provide the heat necessary to maintain a constant temperature. For a reaction of the form

$$Ox + ne^- \leftrightarrow Red$$

The thermoneutral voltage is given by

$$E_{tn} = -\frac{\Delta H}{nF} = \frac{\Delta H_{Red}-\Delta H_{Ox}}{nF}$$

where $\Delta H$ is the change in enthalpy and F is the Faraday constant.

== Explanation ==
For a cell reaction characterized by the chemical equation:

$$Ox + ne^- \leftrightarrow Red$$

at constant temperature and pressure, the thermodynamic voltage (minimum voltage required to drive the reaction) is given by the Nernst equation:

$$E = -\frac{\Delta G}{nF} = \frac{\Delta G_{Red}-\Delta G_{Ox}}{nF}$$

where $\Delta G$ is the Gibbs energy and F is the Faraday constant. The standard thermodynamic voltage (i.e. at standard temperature and pressure) is given by:

$$E^o = -\frac{\Delta G^o}{nF} = \frac{\Delta G^o_{Red}-\Delta G^o_{Ox}}{nF}$$

and the Nernst equation can be used to calculate the standard potential at other conditions.

The cell reaction is generally endothermic: i.e. it will extract heat from its environment. The Gibbs energy calculation generally assumes an infinite thermal reservoir to maintain a constant temperature, but in a practical case, the reaction will cool the electrode interface and slow the reaction occurring there.

If the cell voltage is increased above the thermodynamic voltage, the product of that voltage and the current will generate heat, and if the voltage is such that the heat generated matches the heat required by the reaction to maintain a constant temperature, that voltage is called the "thermoneutral voltage". The rate of delivery of heat is equal to $T \frac{dS}{dt}$ where T is the temperature (the standard temperature, in this case) and dS/dt is the rate of entropy production in the cell. At the thermoneutral voltage, this rate will be zero, which indicates that the thermoneutral voltage may be calculated from the enthalpy.

$$E_{tn} = -\frac{\Delta G + T\Delta S}{nF} = -\frac{\Delta H}{nF} = \frac{\Delta H_{Red}-\Delta H_{Ox}}{nF}$$

== An example ==
For water at standard temperature (25 C) the net cell reaction may be written:

$$H_2O \leftrightarrow H_2(g) + \frac{1}{2}O_2(g)$$

Using Gibbs potentials ($\Delta G^o_{H2O}=-237.18$ kJ/mol), the thermodynamic voltage at standard conditions is

$E^o = -\frac{\Delta G^o_{H_2O}}{2F} \approx$ 1.229 Volt (2 electrons needed to form H_{2}(g))

Just as the combustion of hydrogen and oxygen generates heat, the reverse reaction generating hydrogen and oxygen will absorb heat. The thermoneutral voltage is (using $\Delta H^o_{H2O}=-285.83$ kJ/mol):

$E^o_{tn} = -\frac{\Delta H^o_{H_2O}}{2F} \approx$ 1.481 Volts.
