= Copper(II) chloride =

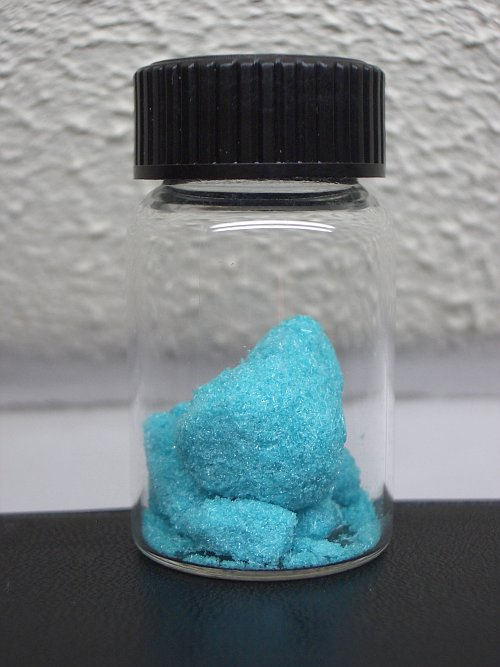
- Dihydrate

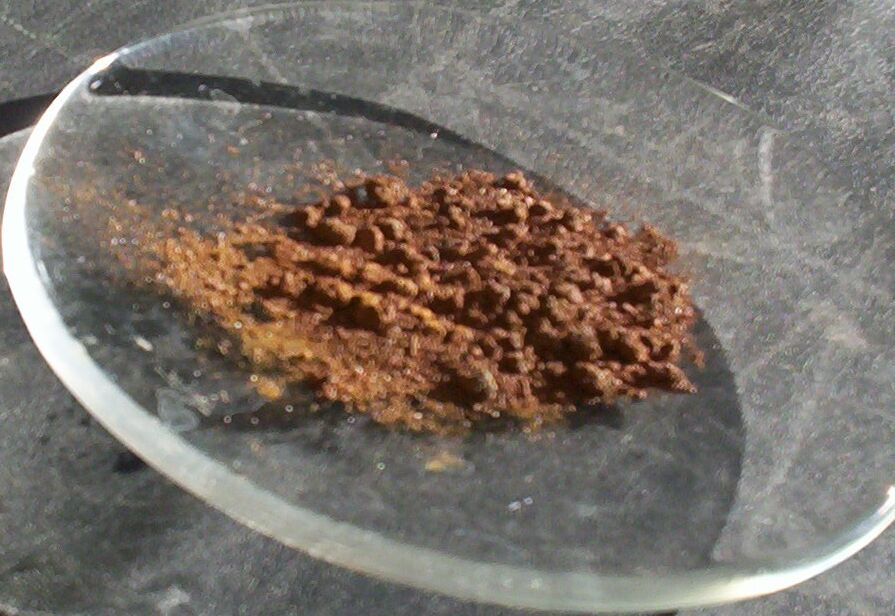
- Anhydrous

Names
- IUPAC name Copper(II) chloride
- Other names Cupric chloride

Identifiers
CAS Number	7447-39-4; 10125-13-0 (dihydrate)
3D model (JSmol)	anhydrous: Interactive image; dihydrate: Interactive image
Beilstein Reference	8128168
ChEBI	CHEBI:49553
ChEMBL	ChEMBL1200553
ChemSpider	148374
DrugBank	DB09131
ECHA InfoCard	100.028.373
EC Number	231-210-2
Gmelin Reference	9300
PubChem CID	24014
RTECS number	GL7000000
UNII	P484053J2Y; S2QG84156O (dihydrate)
UN number	2802
CompTox Dashboard (EPA)	DTXSID7040449
- InChI: InChI=1S/2ClH.Cu/h2*1H;/q;;+2/p-2 Key: ORTQZVOHEJQUHG-UHFFFAOYSA-L; InChI=1/2ClH.Cu/h2*1H;/q;;+2/p-2/rCl2Cu/c1-3-2 Key: ORTQZVOHEJQUHG-LRIOHBSEAE; InChI=1/2ClH.Cu/h2*1H;/q;;+2/p-2 Key: ORTQZVOHEJQUHG-NUQVWONBAE
- SMILES: anhydrous: [Cu+2].[Cl-].[Cl-]; dihydrate: Cl[Cu-2](Cl)([OH2+])[OH2+]

Properties
Chemical formula	CuCl_{2} (anhydrous); CuCl_{2}·2H_{2}O (dihydrate)
Molar mass	134.45 g/mol (anhydrous); 170.48 g/mol (dihydrate)
Appearance	dark brown crystals (anhydrous); light blue crystals (dihydrate)
Odor	odorless
Density	3.4 g/cm^{3} (anhydrous); 2.51 g/cm^{3} (dihydrate)
Melting point	630 °C (1,166 °F; 903 K): (extrapolated); 100 °C (212 °F; 373 K) (dehydration of dihydrate)
Boiling point	993 °C (1,819 °F; 1,266 K) (anhydrous)
Solubility in water	75.7 g/(100 mL) (anhydrous: 25 °C (77 °F), dihydrate: 20 °C (68 °F))
Solubility in acetone	soluble (both)
Solubility in ethanol	53 g/(100 mL) (15 °C (59 °F))
Solubility in methanol	68 g/(100 mL) (dihydrate, 15 °C (59 °F))
Magnetic susceptibility (χ)	1080×10^{−6} cm^{3}/mol (anhydrous); 1420×10^{−6} cm^{3}/mol (dihydrate)

Structure (anhydrous)
Crystal structure	monoclinic
Space group	C2/m [12]
Point group	2/m
Lattice constant	a = 6.93 Å, b = 3.31 Å, c = 6.85 Å α = 90°, β = 119.29°, γ = 90°
Lattice volume (V)	136.93 Å^{3}
Formula units (Z)	2

Structure (dihydrate)
Crystal structure	orthorhombic
Space group	Pbmn
Lattice constant	a = 7.41 Å, b = 8.09 Å, c = 3.75 Å
Formula units (Z)	2

Thermochemistry
Heat capacity (C)	71.9 J⋅mol^{−1}⋅K^{−1}
Std molar entropy (S^{⦵}_{298})	108.1 J⋅mol^{−1}⋅K^{−1}
Std enthalpy of formation (Δ_{f}H^{⦵}_{298})	−220.1 kJ⋅mol^{−1}
Gibbs free energy (Δ_{f}G^{⦵})	−175.7 kJ⋅mol^{−1}
Enthalpy of fusion (Δ_{f}H^{⦵}_{fus})	15.0 kJ⋅mol^{−1}

Hazards
- GHS labelling
Pictograms	(GHS05: Corrosive) (GHS06: Toxic) (GHS07: Exclamation mark) (GHS09: Environmental hazard)
Signal word	Danger
Hazard statements	H301, H302, H312, H315, H318, H319, H335, H410, H411
Precautionary statements	P261, P264, P270, P271, P273, P280, P301+P310, P301+P312, P302+P352, P304+P340, P305+P351+P338, P310, P312, P321, P322, P330, P332+P313, P337+P313, P362, P363, P391, P403+P233, P405, P501
NFPA 704 (fire diamond)	2 0 1
- NIOSH (US health exposure limits)
PEL (Permissible)	1 mg/m^{3} (as Cu)
REL (Recommended)	1 mg/m^{3} (as Cu)
IDLH (Immediate danger)	100 mg/m^{3} (as Cu)
Safety data sheet (SDS)	Fisher Scientific

Related compounds
Other anions	Copper(II) fluoride; Copper(II) bromide
Other cations	Copper(I) chloride; Silver chloride; Gold(III) chloride
- Except where otherwise noted, data are given for materials in their standard state (at 25 °C [77 °F], 100 kPa). verify (what is ?) Infobox references

Copper(II) chloride, also known as cupric chloride, is an inorganic compound with the chemical formula CuCl_{2}. The monoclinic dark brown anhydrous form slowly absorbs moisture to form the orthorhombic light blue dihydrate CuCl_{2}·2H_{2}O, with two water molecules of hydration. It is industrially produced for use as a co-catalyst in the Wacker process.

Both the anhydrous and the dihydrate forms occur naturally as the rare minerals tolbachite and eriochalcite, respectively.

== Structure ==
Anhydrous copper(II) chloride adopts a distorted cadmium iodide structure. In this structure, the copper centers are octahedral. Most copper(II) compounds exhibit distortions from idealized octahedral geometry due to the Jahn-Teller effect, which in this case describes the localization of one d-electron into a molecular orbital that is strongly antibonding with respect to a pair of chloride ligands. In CuCl_{2}·2H_{2}O, the copper again adopts a highly distorted octahedral geometry, the Cu(II) centers being surrounded by two water ligands and four chloride ligands, which bridge asymmetrically to other Cu centers.

Copper(II) chloride is paramagnetic. Of historical interest, CuCl_{2}·2H_{2}O was used in the first electron paramagnetic resonance measurements by Yevgeny Zavoisky in 1944.

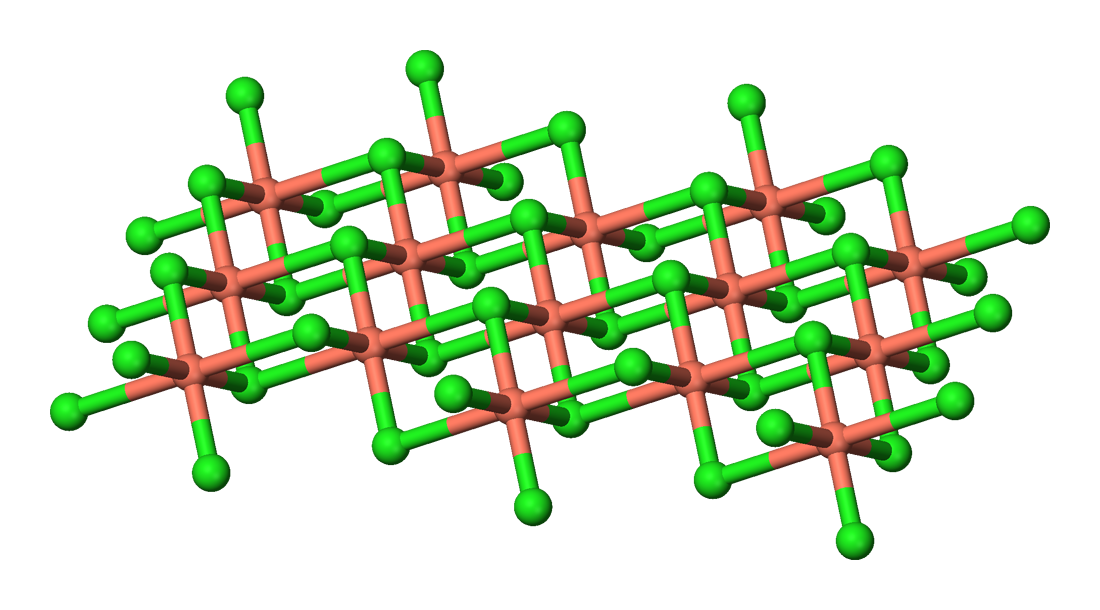
Anhydrous
Copper, Cu
Oxygen, O
Chlorine, Cl
Hydrogen, H

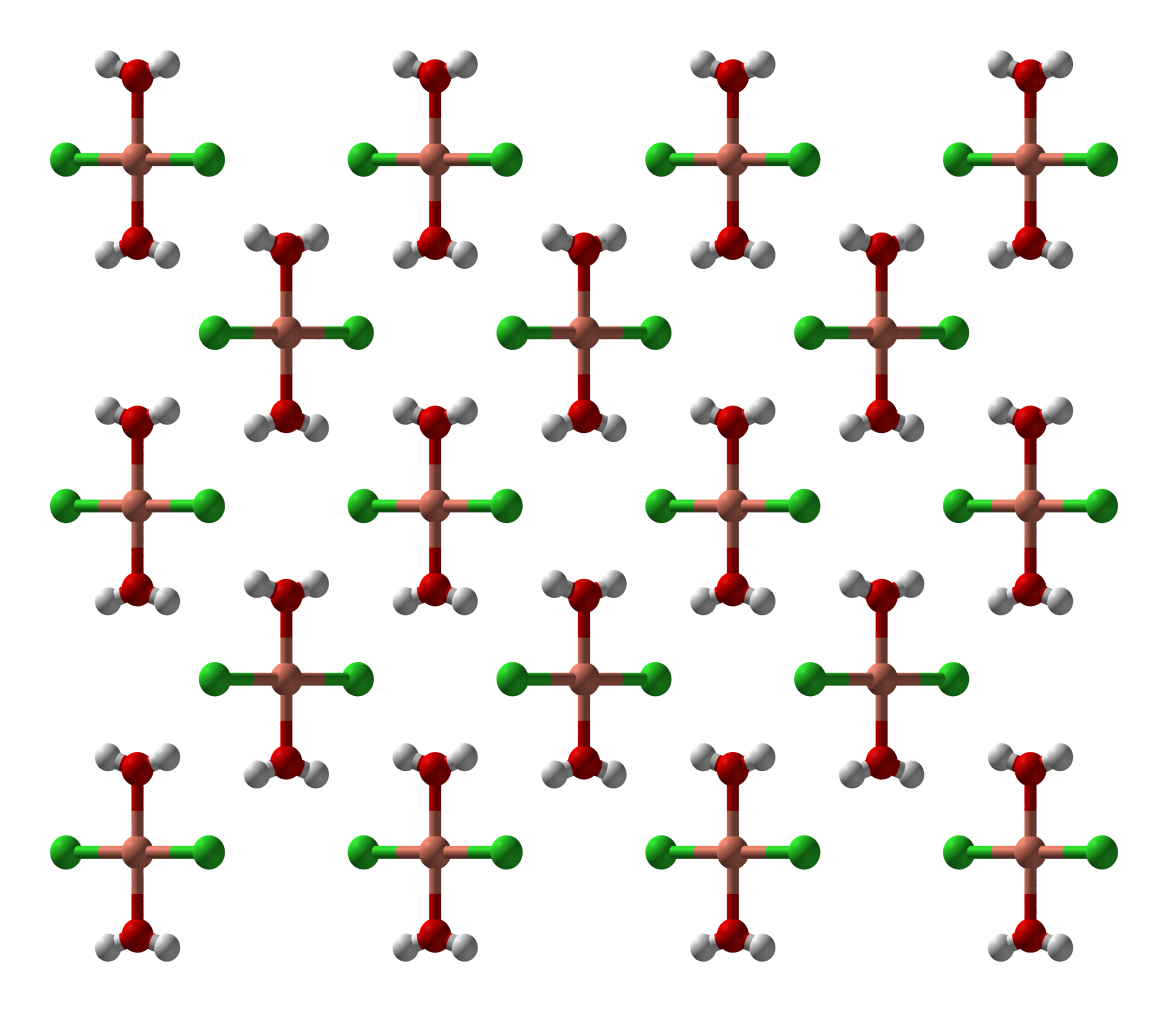
Dihydrate

Structures of the forms of copper(II) chloride

== Properties and reactions ==
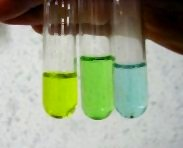
Aqueous solutions of copper(II) chloride. Greenish when high in Cl^{−}, more blue when lower in Cl^{−}.

Aqueous solutions prepared from copper(II) chloride contain a range of copper(II) complexes depending on concentration, temperature, and the presence of additional chloride ions. These species include the blue color of [Cu(H_{2}O)_{6}]^{2+} and the yellow or red color of the halide complexes of the formula [CuCl_{2+x}]^{x−}.

=== Hydrolysis ===
When copper(II) chloride solutions are treated with a base, a precipitation of copper(II) hydroxide occurs:

CuCl_{2} + 2 NaOH → Cu(OH)_{2} + 2 NaCl

Partial hydrolysis gives dicopper chloride trihydroxide, Cu_{2}(OH)_{3}Cl, a popular fungicide. When an aqueous solution of copper(II) chloride is left in the air and isn't stabilized by a small amount of acid, it is prone to undergo slight hydrolysis.

=== Redox and decomposition ===
Copper(II) chloride is a mild oxidant. It starts to decompose to copper(I) chloride and chlorine gas around 400 °C (752 °F) and is completely decomposed near 1,000 °C (1,830 °F):

2 CuCl_{2} → 2 CuCl + Cl_{2}

The reported melting point of copper(II) chloride of 498 °C (928 °F) is a melt of a mixture of copper(I) chloride and copper(II) chloride. The true melting point of 630 °C (1,166 °F) can be extrapolated by using the melting points of the mixtures of CuCl and CuCl_{2}. Copper(II) chloride reacts with several metals to produce copper metal or copper(I) chloride (CuCl) with oxidation of the other metal. To convert copper(II) chloride to copper(I) chloride, it can be convenient to reduce an aqueous solution with sulfur dioxide as the reductant:

2 CuCl_{2} + SO_{2} + 2 H_{2}O → 2 CuCl + 2 HCl + H_{2}SO_{4}

=== Coordination complexes ===
CuCl_{2} reacts with HCl or other chloride sources to form complex ions: the red [CuCl_{3}]^{−} (found in potassium trichloridocuprate(II) K[CuCl_{3}]) (it is a dimer in reality, [Cu_{2}Cl_{6}]^{2−}, a couple of tetrahedrons that share an edge), and the green or yellow [CuCl_{4}]^{2−} (found in potassium tetrachloridocuprate(II) K_{2}[CuCl_{4}]).

CuCl_{2} + Cl^{−} ⇌ [CuCl_{3}]^{−}
CuCl_{2} + 2 Cl^{−} ⇌ [CuCl_{4}]^{2−}

Some of these complexes can be crystallized from aqueous solution, and they adopt a wide variety of structures.

Copper(II) chloride also forms a variety of coordination complexes with ligands such as ammonia, pyridine and triphenylphosphine oxide:

CuCl_{2} + 2 C_{5}H_{5}N → [CuCl_{2}(C_{5}H_{5}N)_{2}] (tetragonal)
CuCl_{2} + 2 (C_{6}H_{5})_{3}P=O → [CuCl_{2}((C_{6}H_{5})_{3}P=O)_{2}] (tetrahedral)

However "soft" ligands such as phosphines (e.g., triphenylphosphine), iodide, and cyanide as well as some tertiary amines induce reduction to give copper(I) complexes.

== Preparation ==
Copper(II) chloride is prepared commercially by the action of chlorination of copper. Copper at red heat (300–400 °C (572–752 °F)) combines directly with chlorine gas, giving (molten) copper(II) chloride. The reaction is very exothermic.

Cu(s) + Cl_{2}(g) → CuCl_{2}(l)

A solution of copper(II) chloride is commercially produced by adding chlorine gas to a circulating mixture of hydrochloric acid and copper. From this solution, the dihydrate can be produced by evaporation.

Although copper metal itself cannot be oxidized by hydrochloric acid, copper-containing bases such as the hydroxide, oxide, or copper(II) carbonate can react to form CuCl_{2} in an acid-base reaction which can subsequently be heated above 100 °C (212 °F) to produce the anhydrous derivative.

Once prepared, a solution of CuCl_{2} may be purified by crystallization. A standard method takes the solution mixed in hot dilute hydrochloric acid, and causes the crystals to form by cooling in a calcium chloride (CaCl_{2}) ice bath.

There are indirect and rarely used means of using copper ions in solution to form copper(II) chloride. Electrolysis of aqueous sodium chloride with copper electrodes produces (among other things) a blue-green foam that can be collected and converted to the hydrate. While this is not usually done due to the emission of toxic chlorine gas, and the prevalence of the more general chloralkali process, the electrolysis will convert the copper metal to copper ions in solution forming the compound. Indeed, any solution of copper ions can be mixed with hydrochloric acid and made into a copper chloride by removing any other ions.

== Uses ==
=== Co-catalyst in Wacker process ===
A major industrial application for copper(II) chloride is as a co-catalyst with palladium(II) chloride in the Wacker process. In this process, ethene (ethylene) is converted to ethanal (acetaldehyde) using water and air. During the reaction, PdCl_{2} reduced to Pd, and the CuCl_{2} serves to re-oxidize this back to PdCl_{2}. Air can then oxidize the resultant CuCl back to CuCl_{2}, completing the cycle.

1. C_{2}H_{4} + PdCl_{2} + H_{2}O → CH_{3}CHO + Pd + 2 HCl
2. Pd + 2 CuCl_{2} → 2 CuCl + PdCl_{2}
3. 4 CuCl + 4 HCl + O_{2} → 4 CuCl_{2} + 2 H_{2}O

The overall process is:

2 C_{2}H_{4} + O_{2} → 2 CH_{3}CHO

=== In organic synthesis ===
Copper(II) chloride has some highly specialized applications in the synthesis of organic compounds. It affects the chlorination of aromatic hydrocarbons—this is often performed in the presence of aluminium oxide. It is able to chlorinate the alpha position of carbonyl compounds:

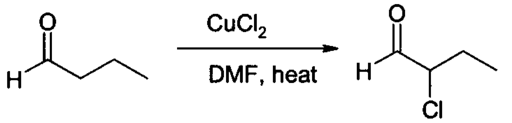

This reaction is performed in a polar solvent such as dimethylformamide, often in the presence of lithium chloride, which accelerates the reaction.

CuCl_{2}, in the presence of oxygen, can also oxidize phenols. The major product can be directed to give either a quinone or a coupled product from oxidative dimerization. The latter process provides a high-yield route to 1,1-binaphthol:

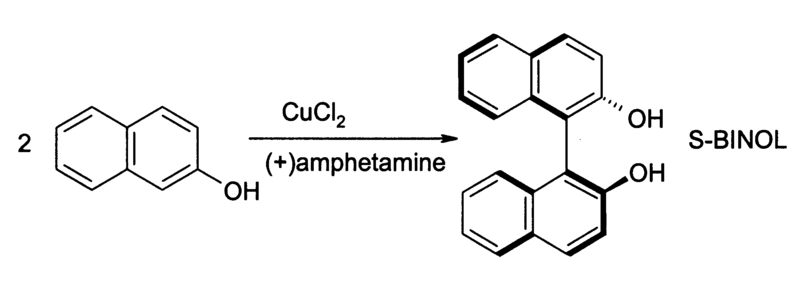

Such compounds are intermediates in the synthesis of BINAP and its derivatives.

Copper(II) chloride dihydrate promotes the hydrolysis of acetonides, i.e., for deprotection to regenerate diols or aminoalcohols, as in this example (where TBDPS = tert-butyldiphenylsilyl):

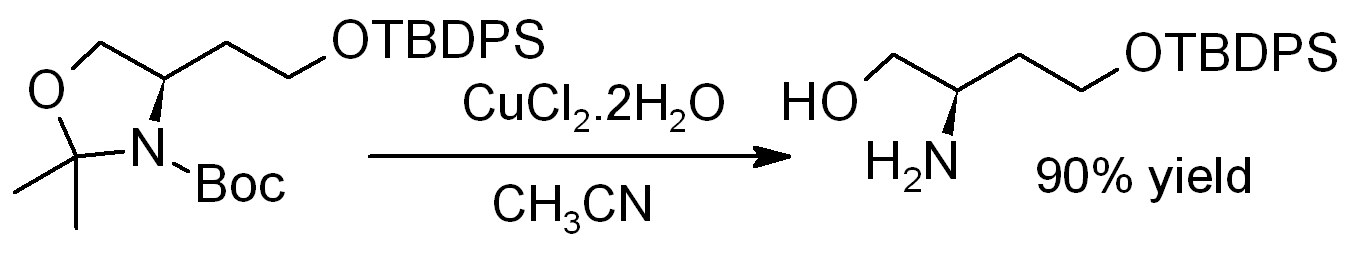

CuCl_{2} also catalyses the free radical addition of sulfonyl chlorides to alkenes; the alpha-chlorosulfone may then undergo elimination with a base to give a vinyl sulfone product.

=== Catalyst in production of chlorine ===
Copper(II) chloride is used as a catalyst in a variety of processes that produce chlorine by oxychlorination. The Deacon process takes place at about 400 to 450 °C (752 to 842 °F) in the presence of a copper chloride:

4 HCl + O_{2} → 2 Cl_{2} + 2 H_{2}O

Copper(II) chloride catalyzes the chlorination in the production of vinyl chloride and dichloromethane.

Copper(II) chloride is used in the copper–chlorine cycle where it reacts with steam into copper(II) oxide dichloride and hydrogen chloride and is later recovered in the cycle from the electrolysis of copper(I) chloride.

=== Niche uses ===
In a flame test, copper chlorides emit green-blue light.

Copper(II) chloride is used as a mordant in the textile industry, petroleum sweetener, wood preservative, and water cleaner.

== Natural occurrence ==
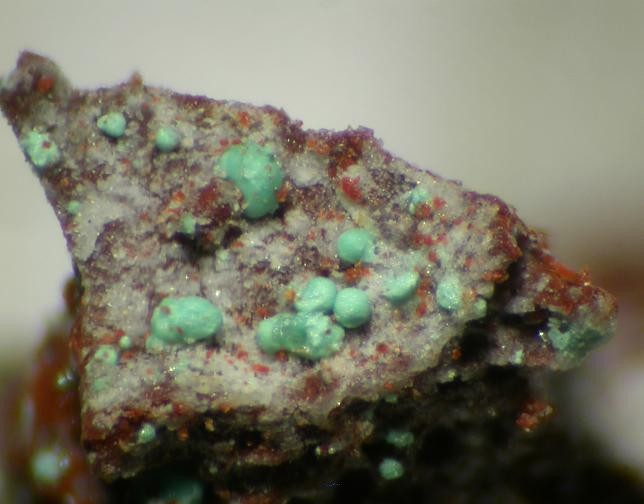
Eriochalcite

Copper(II) chloride occurs naturally as the very rare anhydrous mineral tolbachite and the dihydrate eriochalcite. Both are found near fumaroles and in some copper mines. Mixed oxyhydroxide-chlorides like atacamite (Cu_{2}(OH)_{3}Cl) are more common, arising among Cu ore beds oxidation zones in arid climates.

== Safety and biological impact ==
Copper(II) chloride can be toxic. Only concentrations below 1.3 ppm of aqueous copper ions are allowed in drinking water by the US Environmental Protection Agency. If copper chloride is absorbed, it results in headache, diarrhea, a drop in blood pressure, and fever. Ingestion of large amounts may induce copper poisoning, CNS disorders, and haemolysis.

Copper(II) chloride has been demonstrated to cause chromosomal abnormalities and mitotic cycle disturbances within onion (A. cepa) cells. Such cellular disturbances lead to genotoxicity. Copper(II) chloride has also been studied as a harmful environmental pollutant. Often present in irrigation-grade water, it can negatively affect water and soil microbes. Specifically, denitrifying bacteria were found to be very sensitive to the presence of copper(II) chloride. At a concentration of 0.95 mg/L, copper(II) chloride was found to cause a 50% inhibition (IC50) of the metabolic activity of denitrifying microbes.

== See also ==
- Copper(I) chloride
