= EBU (disambiguation) =

EBU refers to the European Broadcasting Union, an alliance of media organisations.

EBU or Ebu may also refer to:

- Ebu, a town in Guangdong province in the south of China
- Ebu (album), a 1984 jazz album by Hamiet Bluiett
- Eddy break-up model, in combustion engineering
- Embu language of Kenya and Tanzania
- English Bridge Union, a contract bridge governing body
- European Badminton Union, Badminton Europe
- European banking union, a policy of the European Union
- European Bitterness Units for beer
- European Board of Urology
- European Boxing Union
- European Buddhist Union
- Exim Bank (Uganda)
- Saint-Étienne–Bouthéon Airport near Saint-Étienne, France, with IATA code EBU
