= RediRipe =

RediRipe is a technology created at the University of Arizona which detects the production of ethylene, a natural ripening hormone, and displays that detection by means of a sticker that changes from white to blue. This technology has potential on fruits that emit ethylene as they ripen.
