= 1,2-Dichloroethane (data page) =

Chemical data page

This page provides supplementary chemical data on 1,2-dichloroethane.

== Structure and properties ==
Structure and properties
Index of refraction, n_{D}	1.4448
Abbe number	?
Dielectric constant, ε_{r}	10.5 ε_{0} at 20 °C
Bond strength	?
Bond length	?
Bond angle	?
Magnetic susceptibility	?
Surface tension	40.05 mN/m at 10 °C; 38.75 mN/m at 20 °C; 28.4 mN/m at 100 °C
Viscosity	1.1322 mPa·s at 0 °C; 0.8385 mPa·s at 20 °C; 0.6523 mPa·s at 40 °C; 0.4357 mPa·s at 80 °C

== Thermodynamic properties ==
Phase behavior
Triple point	237.2 K (−35.9 °C), ? Pa
Critical point	561.6 K (288.5 °C), 5380 kPa
Std enthalpy change of fusion, Δ_{fus}H^{~~o~~}	8.8366 kJ/mol at −35.9 °C
Std entropy change of fusion, Δ_{fus}S^{~~o~~}	37.25 J/(mol·K) at −35.9 °C
Std enthalpy change of vaporization, Δ_{vap}H^{~~o~~}	33.91 kJ/mol at 20 °C
Std entropy change of vaporization, Δ_{vap}S^{~~o~~}	? J/(mol·K)
Solid properties
Std enthalpy change of formation, Δ_{f}H^{~~o~~}_{solid}	? kJ/mol
Standard molar entropy, S^{~~o~~}_{solid}	? J/(mol K)
Heat capacity, c_{p}	? J/(mol K)
Liquid properties
Std enthalpy change of formation, Δ_{f}H^{~~o~~}_{liquid}	−169.7 kJ/mol
Standard molar entropy, S^{~~o~~}_{liquid}	208.53 J/(mol K)
Enthalpy of combustion, Δ_{c}H^{~~o~~}_{liquid}	−1236.4 kJ/mol
Heat capacity, c_{p}	129.0 J/(mol K)
Gas properties
Std enthalpy change of formation, Δ_{f}H^{~~o~~}_{gas}	−125.4 kJ/mol
Standard molar entropy, S^{~~o~~}_{gas}	? J/(mol K)
Heat capacity, c_{p}	77.5 J/(mol K) at 25 °C

== Vapor pressure of liquid ==
P in mm Hg	1	10	40	100	400	760	1520	3800	7600	15200	30400	45600
T in °C	−44.5_{(s)}	–13.6	10.0	29.4	64.0	83.4	108.1	147.8	183.5	226.5	272.0	—

Table data obtained from CRC Handbook of Chemistry and Physics 44th ed. The (s) annotation indicates temperature is equilibrium of vapor over solid. Otherwise temperature is equilibrium of vapor over liquid.

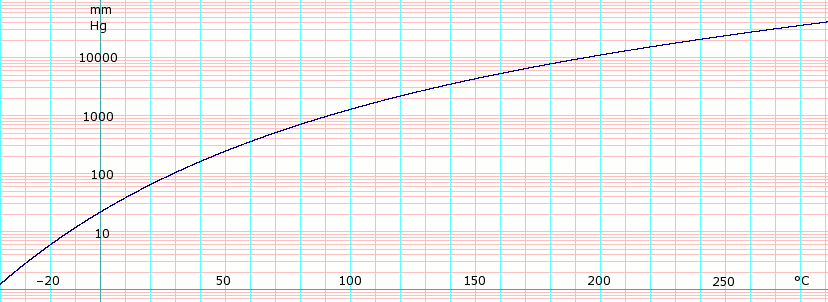
log_{10} of 1,2-dichloroethane vapor pressure. Uses formula: $\scriptstyle \log_e P_{mmHg} =$$\scriptstyle \log_e (\frac {760} {101.325}) - 10.38248\log_e(T+273.15) - \frac {6904.904} {T+273.15} + 83.96795 + 8.368130 \times 10^{-6} (T+273.15)^2$ obtained from CHERIC

== Distillation data ==
See also:

- Tetrachloroethylene (data page)

Vapor-liquid equilibrium of 1,2-Dichloroethylene/ Methanol; P = 96.7 kPa
BP Temp. °C	% by mole methanol
BP Temp. °C	liquid	vapor
63.3	100.00	100.00
60.2	92.01	82.50
59.3	79.52	72.06
58.9	69.03	66.43
59.1	63.50	63.50
59.0	59.02	63.27
59.3	47.91	63.25
59.6	43.02	62.55
61.8	15.03	54.15
66.7	6.01	42.03
82.15	0.00	0.0

Vapor-liquid equilibrium of 1,2-Dichloroethylene/ Ethanol; P = 760 mm Hg
BP Temp. °C	% by mole ethanol
BP Temp. °C	liquid	vapor
79.9	3.0	13.0
78.0	4.2	19.5
76.7	7.3	23.3
74.1	11.3	31.5
72.6	15.2	36.0
70.9	28.3	43.6
70.5	34.5	45.2
70.2	42.5	47.8
70.1	48.8	49.8
70.2	59.8	53.5
70.8	70.5	58.2
71.4	76.5	62.8
72.1	81.7	67.0
74.7	92.3	81.7
75.7	94.8	86.5
77.3	97.8	94.5

Vapor-liquid equilibrium of 1,2-Dichloroethylene/ Toluene; P = 760 mm Hg
BP Temp. °C	% by mole dichloroethane
BP Temp. °C	liquid	vapor
85.5	89.7	94.2
87.5	80.1	89.2
89.1	69.8	82.1
91.3	60.5	78.2
92.9	54.0	72.5
94.6	48.2	66.3
97.1	39.8	60.3
97.8	36.4	55.0
101.5	26.2	42.4
102.7	20.0	34.8
105.7	14.0	27.5
108.1	7.0	16.9
109.1	1.8	6.6

Vapor-liquid equilibrium of 1,2-Dichloroethylene/ Cyclohexane; P = 760 mm Hg
BP Temp. °C	% by mole cyclohexane
BP Temp. °C	liquid	vapor
80.5	6.50	14.60
80.0	8.25	17.00
78.8	12.00	23.70
77.6	17.30	29.80
77.0	21.50	33.40
76.4	26.15	37.50
75.9	31.90	40.80
75.6	36.10	43.60
75.2	42.95	47.60
75.1	51.70	52.50
75.1	52.45	53.00
75.1	56.10	55.10
75.2	59.75	57.10
75.7	72.90	65.60
76.6	82.00	73.50
77.5	88.00	79.80
79.3	95.50	91.50

== Spectral data ==
UV-Vis
λ_{max}	? nm
Extinction coefficient, ε	?
IR
Major absorption bands	? cm^{−1}
NMR
Proton NMR
Carbon-13 NMR
Other NMR data
MS
Masses of main fragments

This box:
- Except where noted otherwise, data relate to Standard temperature and pressure.
- Reliability of data general note.
