= Oxychlorination =

In chemistry, oxychlorination is a process for generating the equivalent of chlorine gas (Cl_{2}) from hydrogen chloride and oxygen. This process is attractive industrially because hydrogen chloride is less expensive than chlorine.

== Mechanism ==
The reaction is usually initiated by copper(II) chloride (CuCl_{2}), which is the most common catalyst in the production of 1,2-dichloroethane. In some cases, CuCl_{2} is supported on silica in presence of KCl, LaCl_{3}, or AlCl_{3} as cocatalysts. Aside from silica, a variety of supports have also been used including various types of alumina, diatomaceous earth, or pumice. Because this reaction is highly exothermic (238 kJ/mol), the temperature is monitored, to guard against thermal degradation of the catalyst. The reaction is as follows:

CH_{2}=CH_{2} + 2 CuCl_{2} → 2 CuCl + ClH_{2}C-CH_{2}Cl

The copper(II) chloride is regenerated by sequential reactions of the cuprous chloride with oxygen and then hydrogen chloride:

½ O_{2} + 2 CuCl → CuOCuCl_{2}
2 HCl + CuOCuCl_{2} → 2 CuCl_{2} + H_{2}O

== Applications ==
Oxychlorination is employed in the conversion of ethylene into vinyl chloride. In the first step in this process, ethylene undergoes oxychlorination to give ethylene chloride:

CH_{2}=CH_{2} + 2 HCl + ½ O_{2} → ClCH_{2}CH_{2}Cl + H_{2}O

Oxychlorination is of special importance in the making of 1,2-dichloroethane, which is then converted into vinyl chloride. As can be seen in the following reaction, 1,2-dichloroethane is cracked:

ClCH_{2}CH_{2}Cl → CH_{2}=CHCl + HCl

The HCl from this cracking process is recycled by oxychlorination in order to reduce the consumption of raw material HCl (or Cl_{2}, if direct chlorination of ethylene is chosen as main way to produce 1,2-dichloroethane).

Iron(III) chloride is produced commercially by oxychlorination (and other methods). For example, dissolution of iron ores in hydrochloric acid gives a mixture of ferrous and ferric chlorides:

Fe_{3}O_{4} + 8 HCl → FeCl_{2} + 2 FeCl_{3} + 4 H_{2}O

The iron(II) chloride is converted to the iron(III) derivative by treatment with oxygen and hydrochloric acid:

4 FeCl_{2} + O_{2} + 4 HCl → 4 FeCl_{3} + 2 H_{2}O
