= Potassium trichloridocuprate(II) =

potassium trichloridocuprate(II)
Names
- Other names: potassium trichlorocuprate(II); potassium copper(II) trichloride

Identifiers
CAS Number	13877-25-3
3D model (JSmol)	Interactive image
ChemSpider	21160205
EC Number	237-639-1
PubChem CID	44145367
CompTox Dashboard (EPA)	DTXSID00930212
- InChI: InChI=1S/3ClH.Cu.K/h3*1H;;/q;;;+2;+1/p-3 Key: SZNHAWRQQIZIBK-UHFFFAOYSA-K
- SMILES: Cl[Cu-](Cl)Cl.[K+]

Properties
Chemical formula	KCuCl_{3}
Molar mass	208.99 g·mol^{−1}
Appearance	garnet-red crystals
Density	2.86 g/cm^{3}
Solubility	methanol, ethanol
- Except where otherwise noted, data are given for materials in their standard state (at 25 °C [77 °F], 100 kPa). Infobox references

Potassium trichloridocuprate(II) is a salt with chemical formula KCuCl_{3}, more properly [K^{+}]_{2}[Cu_{2}Cl^{2−}_{6}].

It is a member of the "halide" sub-family of perovskite materials with general formula ABX_{3} where A is a monovalent cation, B is a divalent cation, and X is a halide anion.

The compound occurs in nature as the bright red mineral sanguite.

The compound is also called potassium trichlorocuprate(II), potassium copper(II) trichloride, potassium cupric chloride and other similar names. The latter is used also for potassium tetrachloridocuprate(II) K_{2}CuCl_{4}.

== Preparation and properties ==
The compound can be obtained by evaporation of a solution of potassium chloride KCl and copper(II) chloride CuCl_{2} in 1:1 mole ratio.

The anhydrous form is garnet-red. It can be crystallized from a molten mixture of potassium chloride KCl and copper(II) chloride CuCl_{2}. or by evaporation from a solution of the salts in ethanol. It is very hygroscopic, and soluble in methanol and ethanol. It is antiferromagnetic below 30 K, and pleochroic, with maximum visible absorption when the electric vector is parallel to the Cu–Cu vector of the dimer.

== Structure ==
=== Anhydrous ===
The anhydrous mineral form (sanguite) has the monoclinic crystal structure, with symmetry group P2_{1}/c and lattice parameters a = 402.81 pm, b = 1379.06 pm, c = 873.35 pm, and β = 97.137°, cell volume V = 0.48138 nm^{3}, and formulas per cell Z = 4. The measured density is 2.86 g/cm^{3}, close to the calculated one 2.88 g/cm^{3}. It contains discrete almost planar anions [Cu_{2}Cl_{6}]^{2−}, each with the two copper atoms connected by two bridging chlorine atoms. These anions are arranged in columns consisting of distorted edge-sharing CuCl_{6} octahedra, stacked in double chains parallel to the a axis. The columns occupy the edges and the centre of the cell's projection on the bc plane. The potassium atoms are located between these columns; each K^{+} cation is surrounded by nine chlorine atoms. The mineral is optically biaxial (negative), with α = 1.653, β = 1.780, γ = 1.900', 2V= 85°. The mineral is named from the Latin sanguis (blood), alluding to its color.

Theoretical calculations for this topology give the lattice parameters as a = 1388.1 pm, b = 427.7 pm, c = 896.5 pm, α = 79.855°, cell volume V = 0.523891 nm^{3}, calculated density 2.65 g/cm^{3}.

=== Theoretical ===
An alternative theoretical structure for the compound has a cubic crystal system, symmetry group Pm3m[221], with the copper atoms arranged as corners of a cubic grid, a potassium atom at the center of each cube and a chlorine atom at the midpoint of each edge. The latice parameters are a = b = c = 485.8 pm, V = 0.114684 nm^{3}, predicted density 3.03 g/cm3.
