= Potassium tetrachloridocuprate(II) =

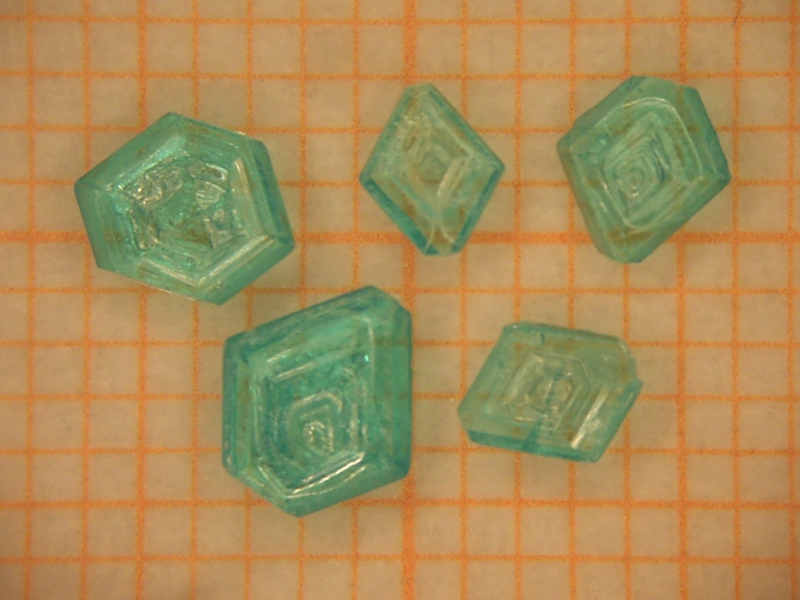

Names
- IUPAC name Potassium tetrachloridocuprate(II)
- Other names: Dipotassium cupric chloride; Dipotassium tetrachlorocuprate; Potassium copper(II) tetrachloride; Potassium tetrachlorocuprate; Potassium tetrachlorocuprate(II); Mitscherlichite (dihydrate mineral)

Identifiers
CAS Number	(anhydrous): 13877-24-2; (dihydrate): 10085-76-4
3D model (JSmol)	(anhydrous): Interactive image; (dihydrate): Interactive image
ChemSpider	(anhydrous): 35294061; (dihydrate): 50645744
PubChem CID	(anhydrous): 22602384; (dihydrate): 25021469
- InChI: (anhydrous): InChI=1S/4ClH.Cu.2K/h4*1H;;;/q;;;;+2;2*+1/p-4 Key: FBNNBYUNXDHBOM-UHFFFAOYSA-J; (dihydrate): InChI=1S/4ClH.Cu.2K.2H2O/h4*1H;;;;2*1H2/q;;;;+2;2*+1;;/p-4 Key: QDLOTAGCTPEFOF-UHFFFAOYSA-J
- SMILES: (anhydrous): [Cl-].[Cl-].[Cl-].[Cl-].[K+].[K+].[Cu+2]; (dihydrate): O.O.[Cl-].[Cl-].[Cl-].[Cl-].[K+].[K+].[Cu+2]

Properties
Chemical formula	K_{2}CuCl_{4} (anhydrous); K_{2}CuCl_{4}·2H_{2}O (dihydrate)
Molar mass	319.585 g/mol (dihydrate)
Appearance	greenish blue crystals (dihydrate)
Density	2.416 g/cm^{3} at 25 °C (dihydrate)

Structure
Crystal structure	(dihydrate:) Tetragonal.Point Group: 4/m 2/m 2/m (probable). Crystals, short prismatic along [001], or pyramidal {011}, minute; in stalactitic growths

Hazards
- GHS labelling
Pictograms	(GHS05: Corrosive) (GHS06: Toxic) (GHS07: Exclamation mark) (GHS09: Environmental hazard)
NFPA 704 (fire diamond)	2 0 1
Flash point	Non-flammable

Related compounds
Other cations	Cesium tetrachloridocuprate(II) ammonium tetrachloridocuprate(II) rubidium tetrachloridocuprate(II) iron(II) tetrachloridocuprate(II)
- Except where otherwise noted, data are given for materials in their standard state (at 25 °C [77 °F], 100 kPa). Infobox references

Potassium tetrachloridocuprate(II) describes salts with chemical formula K_{2}CuCl_{4}(H_{2}O)_{2}. It is a greenish blue solid. This form also occurs naturally as the rare mineral mitscherlichite.

== Synthesis and natural occurrence ==
The dihydrate occurs rarely in nature near volcanic vents, e.g. in Mount Vesuvius, as the mineral mitscherlichite; which is named in honor of Eilhardt Mitscherlich (1794–1863), the German crystallographer and chemist who first synthesized the compound. It was identified as pigment in some ancient artifacts. The dihydrate can be obtained by slow evaporation of a solution of potassium chloride (KCl) and copper(II) chloride (CuCl_{2}) in 2:1 molar ratio.

== Structure ==
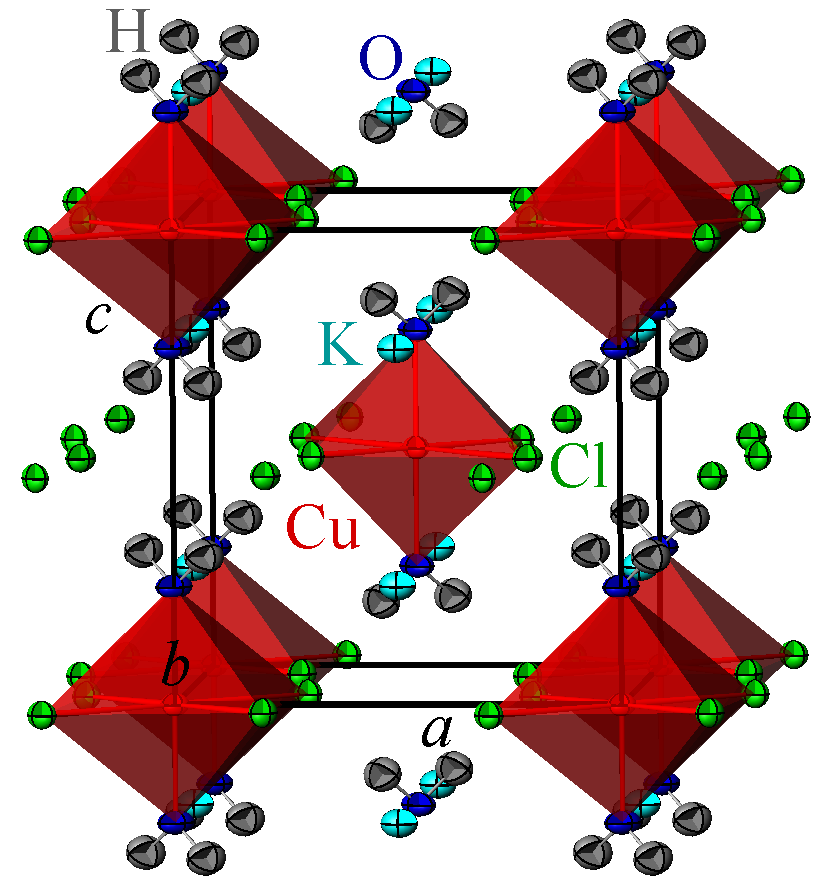
Structure of K_{2}CuCl_{4}·2H_{2}O (mitscherlichite).

The structure of hydrated potassium tetrachloridocuprate(II) has been confirmed by X-ray crystallography and neutron diffraction. Copper is square planar, being bound to two trans chloride ligands (d_{Cu-Cl} = 228 pm and two water ligands (d_{Cu-O} = 1.97 pm). The other chlorides are more distant (Cu-Cl = 289 pm). Structural studies on this salt are of historic interest. The compound is isostructural with (NH_{4})_{2}CuCl_{4}·2H_{2}O and Rb_{2}CuCl_{4}·2H_{2}O.

== Tetrachlorocuprates ==
Anhydrous K_{2}CuCl_{4} has a complicated history and may not exist. Instead it converts upon heating to a mixture of KCl·CuCl_{2} and potassium trichloridocuprate KCuCl_{3}.

The ion CuCl_{4}]^{2−} has been intensively studied from the perspective of electronic structure. It is a planar complex, usually isolated as a salt with organic cations.

== See also ==
- Potassium trichloridocuprate(II), KCuCl_{3}
