= Eddy break-up model =

Model in combustion

The eddy break-up model (EBU) is used in combustion engineering. Combustion modeling has a wide range of applications. In most of the combustion systems, fuel and oxygen (or air) are separately supplied in the combustion chamber. Due to this, chemical reaction and combustion occur simultaneously in the combustion chamber. However, the rate of the chemical reaction is faster than the rate of mixing fuel and oxygen. Therefore, that rate of combustion is controlled by rate of mixing. Such cases, where formation of pre-mixture is difficult, are called diffusion combustion or diffusion flames.

== Diffusion flames ==
Diffusion flames can be laminar diffusion flames (e.g. candles and matches burning in the air etc.) or turbulent diffusion flames (e.g. furnaces, turbo-machinery, some liquid-fuel rocket engines and internal combustion engines) depending on the nature of mixed gas flow. Further, the flame shapes of this kind of burning are divided into two categories oxygen-rich diffusion flames and oxygen-deficient. Flame shapes also depend on the discharging velocity of fuel and air. Eddies inside the air flow plays an important role in deciding the flame shapes. With increase in discharging velocity of fuel into the air laminar diffusion flames tends to become turbulent diffusion flames. This leads to an increase in the flame height and finally it gains a maximum height (critical limit). After this limit further increase in the jet velocity of the fuel adds to instability of turbulent flame. The position where laminar flame is changing into turbulent flame is termed as "break-up point". Increase in jet velocity after critical limit results in decrease of the whole flame height. Beyond this point the height of the break-up point reaches a certain value where even after increasing the jet velocity of fuel the flame height will not change. Studies by Hawthorne et al. prove that the chemical reaction rates in turbulent diffusion flames and in laminar diffusion flames are almost similar.

== Problems ==
Combustion plays a vital role in many applications and a proper understanding of its effect on the system can be very helpful in designing the newer technologies and improving the existing ones. Nowadays, numerical modeling is a most effective tool for understanding and studying such problems. But a number of problems are associated with it such as:

- The control equations associated are very complicated.
- Large number of control equation need to be studied which include knowledge of both fluid dynamics and chemistry of chemical reactions during combustion.
- Involvement of huge number of components in the chemical reactions.
- There are serious time-scale problems because of mismatch in chemical reaction rate and fluid transport rate.
- Effect of several other processes like heat transfer, radiation, convection and diffusion.

== Combustion models ==
Many combustion models have been proposed. There is a long list of such models in literature but due to simplicity the eddy break-up model originally proposed by Spalding and later modified by Magnussen and Hjertager (Magnussen model) became popular models. It is based on the assumption that the reaction rate is controlled by turbulent mixing because of the dependence of reaction rate on the mixing of the turbulent eddies. It is well documented that there are strong interactions between the turbulent flow and reactions. The heat released during the reaction affects the density and hence turbulence. While the turbulent flow induces changes concentration and temperature pulsations which enhance the mixing and heat transfer and affect the reaction rate. Turbulence also results in deformations in burning flame surface due to which folding occurs and the surface is also broken into pieces of different sizes. This enhances the total surface area of the flame and thus increases the combustible mixed gases burnt per unit time. Due to this, turbulent flames grow at a much faster rate than that of laminar flames.

== Formula ==
Spalding (1971) defined rate of fuel consumption as a function of local flow properties of fuel and oxidant. This model is based on a single step global infinitely fast stoichiometric chemical reaction.

1 kg of fuel + s kg of oxidant→(1+s) kg of products

For m_{j} as mass fraction and M_{j} as molecular weight of species j; local density of mixture (ρ) is dependent on concentration of reactant and products and temperature of mixture. It can be mathematically calculated as:

${\rho = \frac{P}{RT\sum_{\text{for all j}}{\frac{m_j}{M_j}}}}$	1

It is used to express the turbulent dissipation rate of fuel (R_{fu}), oxygen (R_{ox}) and products (R_{pr}) following the proposal from Magnussen and Hjertager as:

${R_{fu}=-C_R\rho m_{fu}\frac{\varepsilon}{k}}$	2

${R_{ox}=-C_R\rho \frac{m_{ox}}{s}\frac{\varepsilon}{k}}$	3

${R_{pr}=-C_R^{'}\rho \frac{m_{pr}}{(1+s)}\frac{\varepsilon}{k}}$	4

Where k is the turbulent kinetic energy, ε is the rate of dissipation of k, C_{R} and C'_{R} are model constants (value varies from 0.35 to 4). The reaction rate of fuel is considered to be smallest among all and is given by:

${S_{fu}=-\rho\frac{\varepsilon}{k}min\biggl[C_Rm_{fu}, C_R\frac{m_{ox}}{s}, C_R^{'}\frac{m_{pr}}{1+s}\biggr]}$	5

The model also leads to determination of mass fraction of product and oxygen using transport equation of mixture fraction (f)

${ f=\frac{[{sm}_{fu}-m_{ox}]-{[{sm}_{fu}-m_{ox}]}_0}{{[{sm}_{fu}-m_{ox}]}_1-{[{sm}_{fu}-m_{ox}]}_0}}$	6

For solving we need to first find the stoichiometric mixture fraction (f_{st}) when there is no fuel and oxygen is present in products, which is defined as

${f_{st}=\frac{m_{ox, 0}}{{sm}_{fu, 1}+m_{ox, 0}}}$	7

${If f < f_{st}, f=\frac{-m_{ox}+m_{ox, 0}}{{sm}_{fu, 1}+m_{ox, 0}}}$	8

${{If} f > f_{st}, f=\frac{-{sm}_{fu, 1}+m_{ox, 0}}{{sm}_{fu, 1}+m_{ox, 0}}}$	9

Above equations (7–9) not only show linear relation of mixture fraction with mass fraction of oxygen and products but also help in predicting their values. Magnussen and Hjertager (1976) utilize this model and conformity of experimental results with predictions supports this model. Several other researchers also justified the beauty of this model for fairly good predictions which are quite close to experimental results. Hence, this model is a topic of top priority due to its simplicity, steady convergence, and implementation in computational fluid dynamics (CFD) procedures.
