= Ethylene (data page) =

Chemical data page

This page provides supplementary chemical data on ethylene.

== Structure and properties ==
Structure and properties
Index of refraction	?
Dielectric constant	? ε_{0} at ? °C
Bond strength	?
Bond length	C-C 133pm C-H 108 pm
Bond angle	121.7
Magnetic susceptibility	?

== Thermodynamic properties ==
Phase behavior
Triple point	104 K (−169 °C), 120 Pa
Critical point	282.5 K (9.4 °C), 50.6 bar
Std enthalpy change of fusion, Δ_{fus}H^{~~o~~}	+3.35 kJ/mol
Std entropy change of fusion, Δ_{fus}S^{~~o~~}	+32.2 J/(mol·K)
Std enthalpy change of vaporization, Δ_{vap}H^{~~o~~}	+13.5 kJ/mol
Std entropy change of vaporization, Δ_{vap}S^{~~o~~}	? J/(mol·K)
Solid properties
Std enthalpy change of formation, Δ_{f}H^{~~o~~}_{solid}	? kJ/mol
Standard molar entropy, S^{~~o~~}_{solid}	? J/(mol K)
Heat capacity, c_{p}	? J/(mol K)
Liquid properties
Std enthalpy change of formation, Δ_{f}H^{~~o~~}_{liquid}	? kJ/mol
Standard molar entropy, S^{~~o~~}_{liquid}	117.8 J/(mol K)
Heat capacity, c_{p}	67.4 J/(mol K)
Gas properties
Std enthalpy change of formation, Δ_{f}H^{~~o~~}_{gas}	+52.47 kJ/mol
Standard molar entropy, S^{~~o~~}_{gas}	219.32 J/(mol K)
Enthalpy of combustion, Δ_{c}H^{~~o~~}	–1387.4 kJ/mol
Heat capacity, c_{p}	42.9 J/(mol K)
van der Waals' constants	a = 453.02 L^{2} kPa/mol^{2} b = 0.05714 liter per mole

== Vapor pressure of liquid ==
P in mmHg	1	10	40	100	400	760	1520	3800	7600	15200	30400
T in °C	–168.3	–153.2	–141.3	–131.8	–113.9	–103.7	–90.8	–71.1	–52.8	–29.1	–1.5	—

Table data obtained from CRC Handbook of Chemistry and Physics, 44th ed.

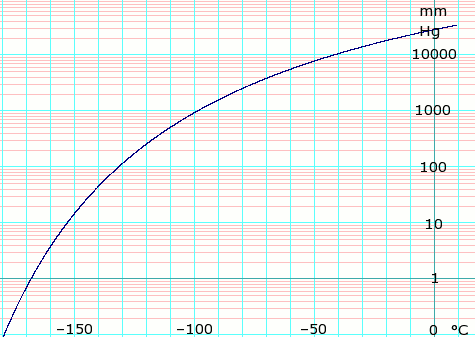
log_{10} of ethylene vapor pressure. Uses formula: $\scriptstyle \log_{10} P_{mmHg} = 6.74756 - \frac {585.00} {255.00+T}$, obtained from Lange's Handbook of Chemistry, 10th ed.

== Spectral data ==
UV-Vis
λ_{max}	? nm
Extinction coefficient, ε	?
IR
Major absorption bands	974 cm^{−1}
NMR
Proton NMR
Carbon-13 NMR
Other NMR data
MS
Masses of main fragments

== Material Safety Data Sheet ==
The handling of this chemical may incur notable safety precautions. It is highly recommend that you seek the Material Safety Datasheet (MSDS) for this chemical from a reliable source such as SIRI, and follow its directions.

This box:
- Except where noted otherwise, data relate to Standard temperature and pressure.
- Reliability of data general note.
