= Jan Rudolph Deiman =

German-Dutch physician and chemist

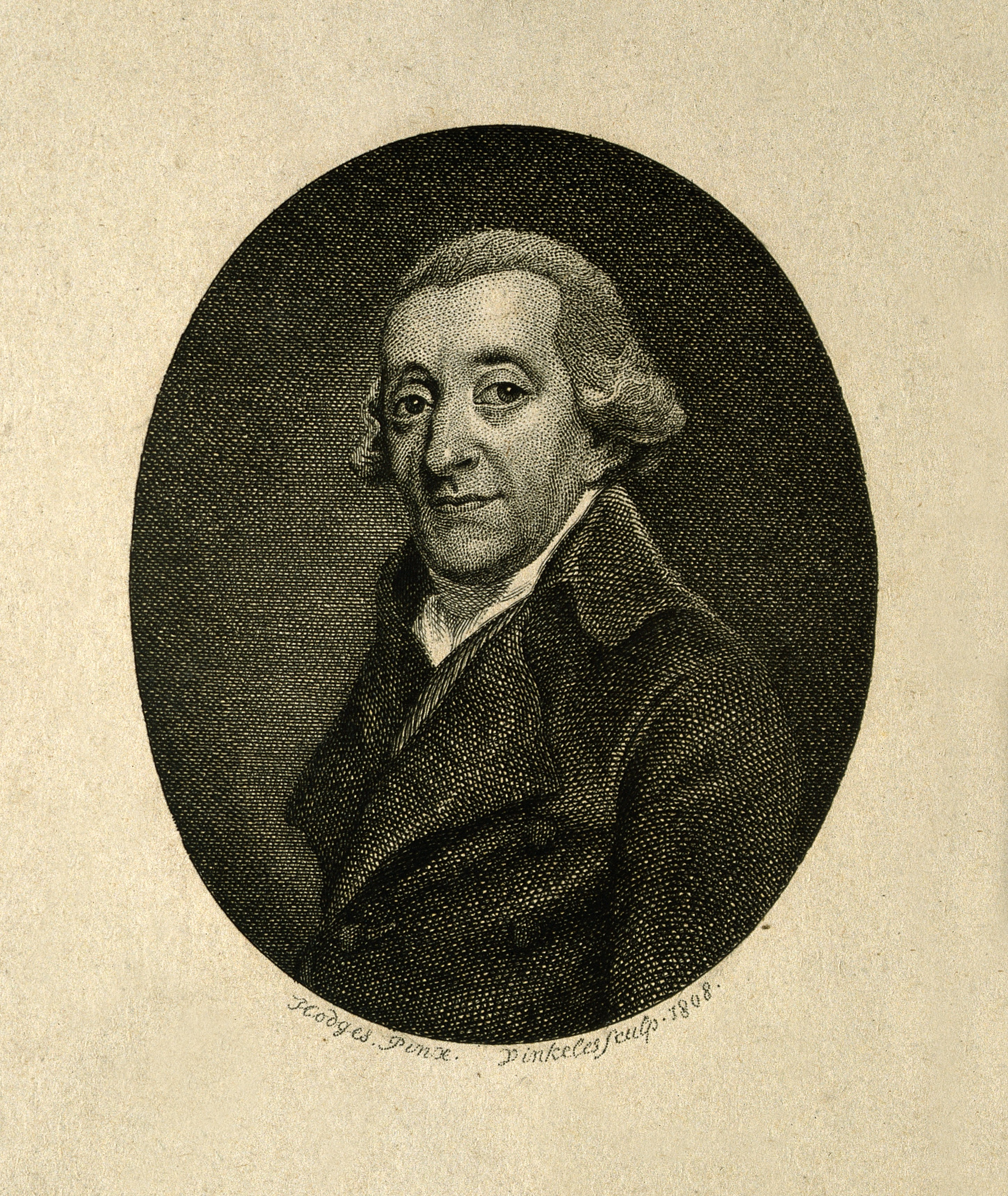

Jan Rudolph Deiman or Johann Rudolf Deimann (29 August 1743 – 15 January 1808) was a German-Dutch physician and chemist who was among the first to examine electrolysis of water, and examine the application of electricity for medical uses along with Adriaan Paets van Troostwijk. In 1791, they founded the De Bataafsche Societeit (The Batavian Society) which later became the Gezelschap der Hollandsche Scheikundigen (Society of Dutch Chemists).

== Life and work ==
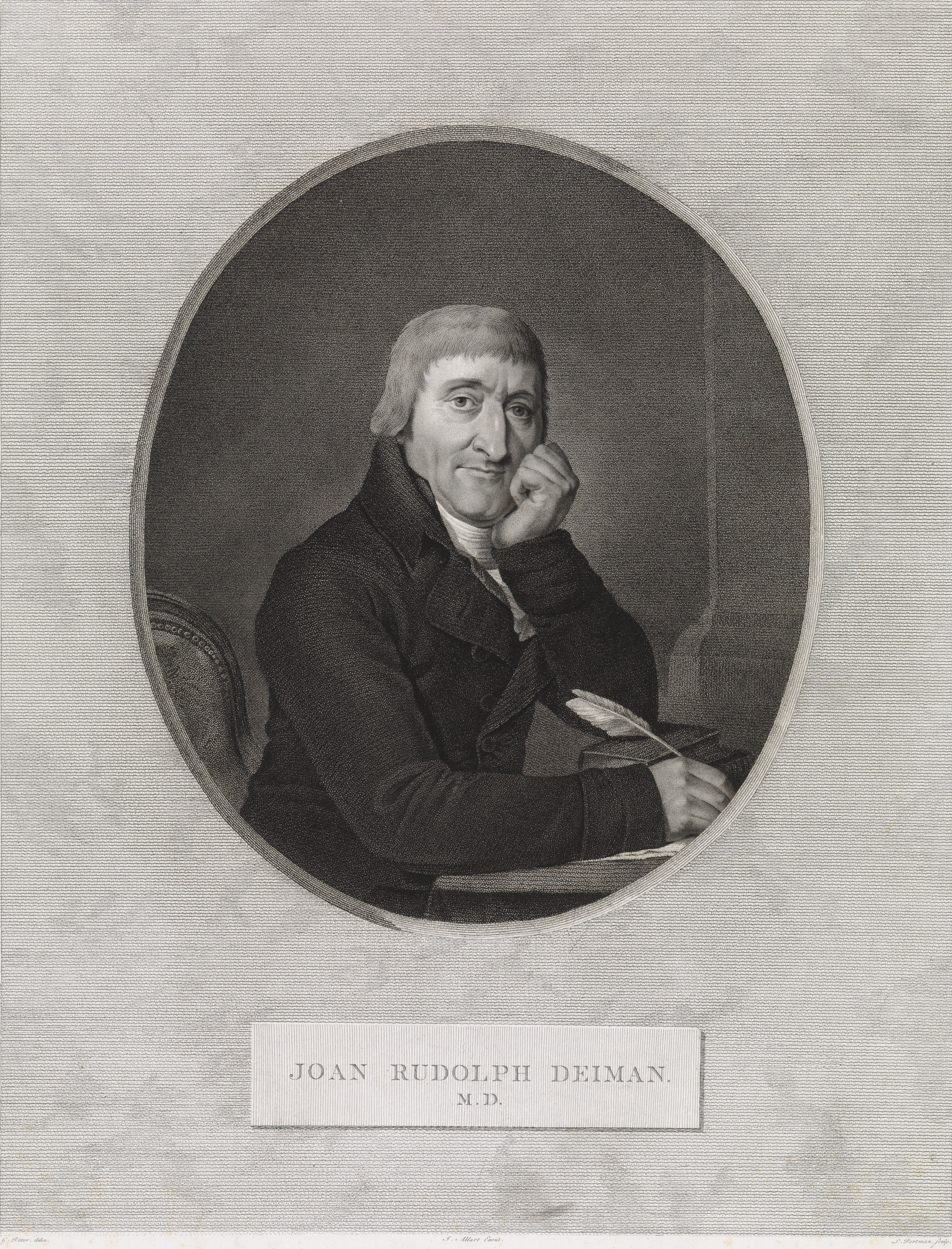

Deiman was the youngest child of solicitor Albertus Deiman and Volke Hiddes in Hage, East Friesland. His mother died when he was a year old, and after the death of his father around 1758 he lived with his older brothers and apprenticed as an apothecary in Leer before studying medicine and philosophy in Halle with Adolph Böhmer. In 1770 he graduated after writing a Dissertatio inauguralis de indicatione vitali generetium and soon moved to practice medicine in Amsterdam. He studied philosophy and participated in discussions of learned societies, becoming a member of the Hollandse Maatschappij der Wetenschappen te Haarlem in 1783, and began to collaborate on experiments along with Adrian Paets van Troostwijk. Their 1778 work on the electrolysis of water was particularly well known. They also examined the role of plants in modifying the air. His medical works included a treatise on the tapeworm. 1,2-dichloroethane was known for a while as Dutch liquid because it was synthesized by Dutch botanist Nicolaas Bondt (1765–1796), Deiman and Troostwyck. Deiman and other also edited the journal Chemische en Physische Oefeningen after 1797. A year before his death, he was appointed physician to King Louis_Bonaparte.
