= Magnussen model =

Method for computing reaction rates

Magnussen model is a popular method for computing reaction rates as a function of both mean concentrations and turbulence levels (Magnussen and Hjertager). Originally developed for combustion, it can also be used for liquid reactions by tuning some of its parameters. The model consists of rates calculated by two primary means. An Arrhenius, or kinetic rate, $R_{K\_i',k}$, for species $i'$ in reaction $k$, is governed by the local mean species concentrations and temperature in the following way:

$$R_{K\_i',k} = - \nu_{i',k} M_i A_k T^{\beta_k} \exp{\left( -\frac{E_k}{RT} \right)} \prod_{j'=1}^{N} \left[ C_{j'} \right]^{\eta_{j',k}} = K_{i',k}  M_{i'} \prod_{j'=1}^{N} \left[ C_{j'} \right]^{\eta_{j',k}}$$

This expression describes the rate at which species $i'$ is consumed in reaction $k$. The constants $A_k$ and $E_k$, the Arrhenius pre-exponential factor and activation energy, respectively, are adjusted for specific reactions, often as the result of experimental measurements. The stoichiometry for species $i'$ in reaction $k$ is represented by the factor $\nu_{i',k}$, and is positive or negative, depending upon whether the species serves as a product or reactant. The molecular weight of the species $i'$ appears as the factor $M_{i'}$. The temperature, $T$, appears in the exponential term and also as a factor in the rate expression, with an optional exponent, $\beta_k$. Concentrations of other species, $j'$, involved in the reaction, $\left[ C_{j'} \right]$, appear as factors with optional exponents associated with each. Other factors and terms not appearing in the equation, can be added to include effects such as the presence of non-reacting species in the rate equation. Such so-called third-body reactions are typical of the effect of a catalyst on a reaction, for example. Many of the factors are often collected into a single rate constant, $K_{i',k}$.
