= Adriaan Paets van Troostwijk =

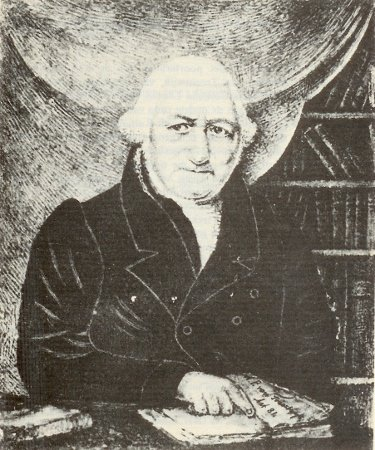

Adriaan Paets van Troostwijk (4 March 1752 – 3 April 1837) was a Dutch businessman and an amateur chemist. He conducted experiments and theorized on the nature of substances, conduct some of the earliest experiments on the electrolysis of water in collaboration with physician Johan Rudolph Deiman (1743–1808).

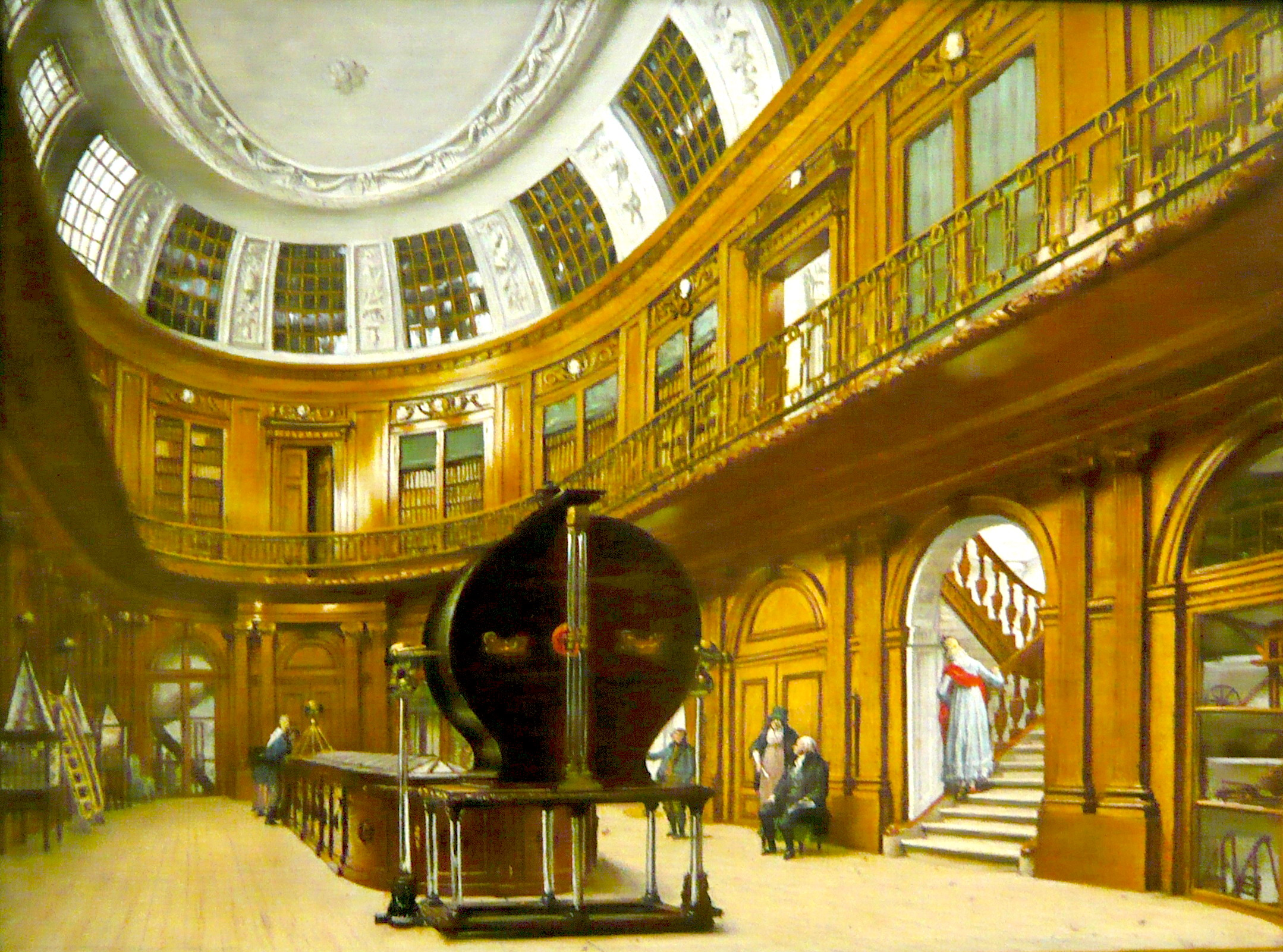
Electrostatic generator at Teyler's museum that was used for many of the experiments

Van Troostwijk was born in Utrecht to cloth-merchant Wouter van Troostwijk and Johanna Dolphina Paets. He married Marie Cornelia Loten in 1770 and joined the business of his father-in-law in Amsterdam until 1816 and lived in Nieuwersluis subsequently. Here he became a member of the Felix Meritis, an Amsterdam organization of polymaths founded in 1777. Along with his physician friend Jan Deiman, he conducted experiments and wrote 35 papers between 1778 and 1818. The director of the Haarlem Teylers museum Martinus van Marum also collaborated with Paets van Troostwijk. Using an electrostatic generator, he was able to split water with gold as an electrode (acting as a catalyst as examined in studies in the 21st century) and was able to identify the components oxygen and hydrogen. In 1778 he conducted experiments on plants and their modification of the air. Van Marum lived for some time in Paris in 1785 and became a follower of Lavoisier's theory on carbon dioxide being formed from oxygen in the process of burning but Troostwijk stuck to the old phlogiston theory until 1788. In 1792 he published on experiments with sulphide compounds. Along with Cornelis Rudolphus Theodorus Krayenhoff he examined cures and medical applications of electricity. Along with Deiman the founded a society in 1791 called the De Bataafsche Societeit (The Batavian Society) which later was called the Gezelschap der Hollandsche Scheikundigen (Society of Dutch Chemists). In 1815 he purchased the Sterreschans estate.

== Authority control ==
- De l'Application de l'électricité à la physique et à la médecine (1788) ["The application of electricity to medicine" written with Baron Krayenhoff]
- Verhandeling over het nut van den groei der boomen en planten, tot zuivering der lucht (1780) ["On the influence of plants on air quality" written with J.R. Deiman]
