= Ethylene =

Hydrocarbon compound (H2C=CH2)

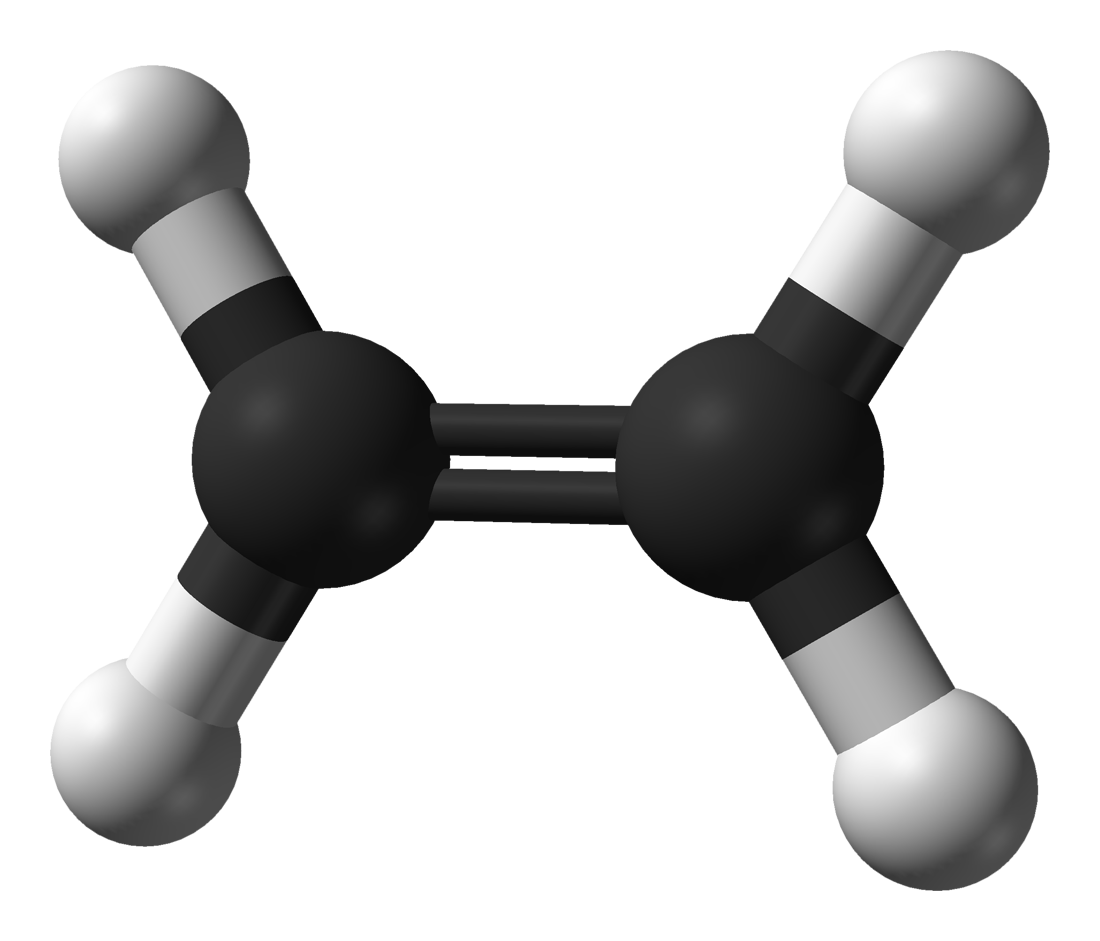

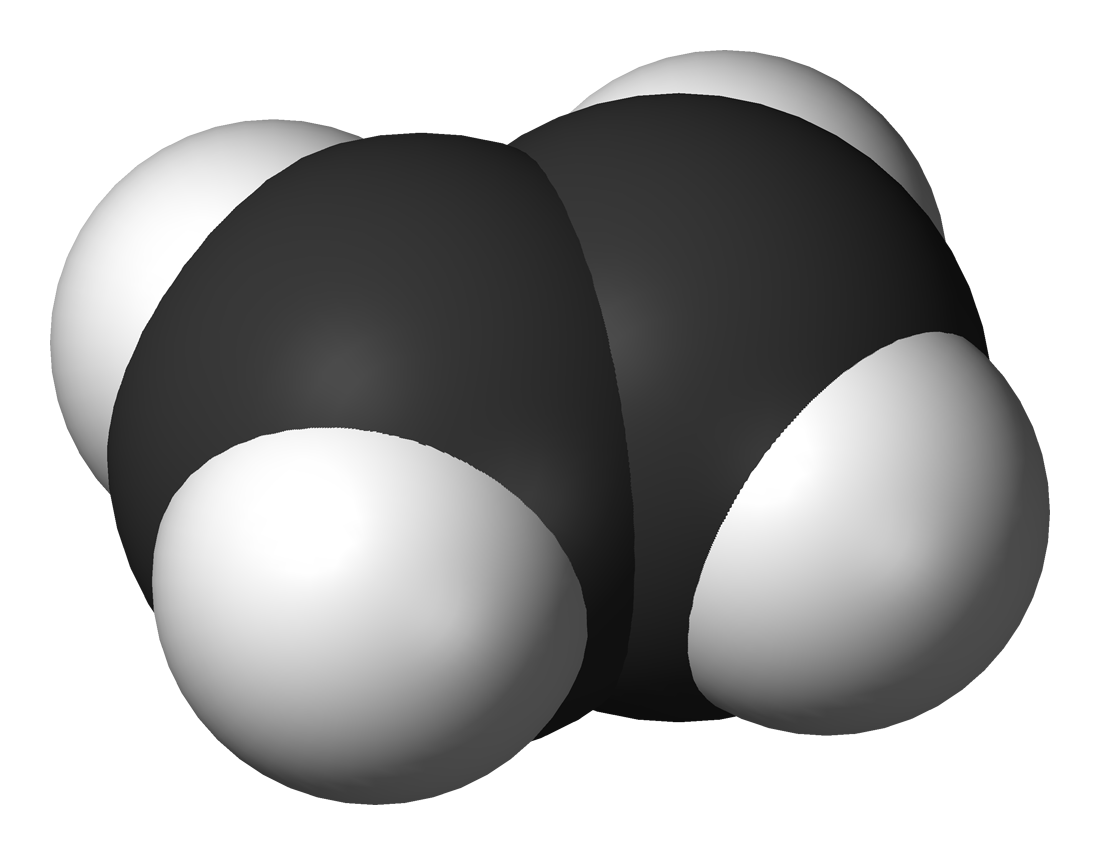

Names
- Preferred IUPAC name Ethene
- Systematic IUPAC name Ethene
- Other names Refrigerant R-1150

Identifiers
CAS Number	74-85-1
3D model (JSmol)	Interactive image
Beilstein Reference	1730731
ChEBI	CHEBI:18153
ChEMBL	ChEMBL117822
ChemSpider	6085
ECHA InfoCard	100.000.742
EC Number	200-815-3
Gmelin Reference	214
KEGG	C06547
PubChem CID	6325
RTECS number	KU5340000
UNII	91GW059KN7
UN number	1962 1038
CompTox Dashboard (EPA)	DTXSID1026378
- InChI: InChI=1S/C2H4/c1-2/h1-2H2 Key: VGGSQFUCUMXWEO-UHFFFAOYSA-N; InChI=1/C2H4/c1-2/h1-2H2 Key: VGGSQFUCUMXWEO-UHFFFAOYAE
- SMILES: C=C

Properties
Chemical formula	C_{2}H_{4}
Molar mass	28.054 g·mol^{−1}
Appearance	colourless gas
Density	1.178 kg/m^{3} at 15 °C, gas
Melting point	−169.2 °C (−272.6 °F; 104.0 K)
Boiling point	−103.7 °C (−154.7 °F; 169.5 K)
Solubility in water	131 mg/L (25 °C); 2.9 mg/L
Solubility in ethanol	4.22 mg/L
Solubility in diethyl ether	good
Acidity (pK_{a})	44
Conjugate acid	Ethenium
Magnetic susceptibility (χ)	−15.30·10^{−6} cm^{3}/mol
Viscosity	10.28 μPa·s

Structure
Molecular shape	D_{2h}
Dipole moment	zero

Thermochemistry
Std molar entropy (S^{⦵}_{298})	219.32 J·K^{−1}·mol^{−1}
Std enthalpy of formation (Δ_{f}H^{⦵}_{298})	+52.47 kJ/mol

Hazards
- GHS labelling
Pictograms	(GHS02: Flammable) (GHS07: Exclamation mark)
Signal word	Danger
Hazard statements	H220, H336
Precautionary statements	P210, P261, P271, P304+P340, P312, P377, P381, P403, P403+P233, P405, P501
NFPA 704 (fire diamond)	2 4 2
Flash point	−136 °C (−213 °F; 137 K)
Autoignition temperature	542.8 °C (1,009.0 °F; 815.9 K)
Safety data sheet (SDS)	ICSC 0475

Related compounds
Related compounds	Ethane; Acetylene; Propylene

Supplementary data page
- Ethylene (data page)
- Except where otherwise noted, data are given for materials in their standard state (at 25 °C [77 °F], 100 kPa). verify (what is ?) Infobox references

Ethylene (IUPAC name: ethene) is a hydrocarbon which has the formula C_{2}H_{4} or H_{2}C=CH_{2}. It is a colourless, flammable odorless gas. It is the simplest alkene (a hydrocarbon with carbon–carbon double bonds).

Ethylene is widely used in the chemical industry, and its worldwide production (over 225 million tonnes in 2022) exceeds that of any other organic compound. Much of this production goes toward creating polyethylene, which is a widely used plastic containing polymer chains of ethylene units in various chain lengths.

Ethylene is also an important natural plant hormone and is used in agriculture to induce ripening of fruits. The hydrate of ethylene is ethanol.

== Structure and properties ==
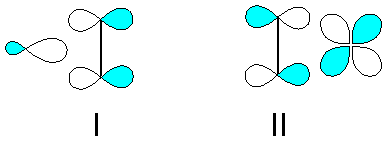
Orbital description of bonding between ethylene and a transition metal

This hydrocarbon has four hydrogen atoms bound to a pair of carbon atoms that are connected by a double bond. All six atoms that comprise ethylene are coplanar. The H-C-H angle is 117.4°, close to the 120° for ideal sp² hybridized carbon. The molecule is also relatively weak: rotation about the C-C bond is a high energy process that requires breaking the π-bond by supplying heat at 50 °C.

The π-bond in the ethylene molecule is responsible for its useful reactivity. The double bond is a region of high electron density, thus it is susceptible to attack by electrophiles. Many reactions of ethylene are catalyzed by transition metals, which bind temporarily to the ethylene using both the π and π* orbitals.

Being a simple molecule, ethylene is spectroscopically simple. Its UV-Vis spectrum is still used as a test of theoretical methods.

== Production ==
To give a sense of the scale of production, 107 million tonnes were produced in 2005. This technology results in significant greenhouse gas emissions, namely significant amounts of carbon dioxide.

=== Industrial process ===
Ethylene is produced by several methods in the petrochemical industry. A primary method is steam cracking (SC) where hydrocarbons and steam are heated to 750–950 °C. This process converts large hydrocarbons into smaller ones and introduces unsaturation. When ethane is the feedstock, ethylene is the product. Ethylene is separated from the resulting mixture by repeated compression and distillation. In Europe and Asia, ethylene is obtained mainly from cracking naphtha, gasoil and condensates with the coproduction of propylene, C4 olefins and aromatics (pyrolysis gasoline). Other procedures employed for the production of ethylene include Fischer-Tropsch synthesis and methanol-to-olefins (MTO).

=== Laboratory synthesis ===
Although of great value industrially, ethylene is rarely synthesized in the laboratory and is ordinarily purchased. It can be produced via dehydration of ethanol with sulfuric acid or in the gas phase with activated alumina.

=== Biosynthesis ===
Ethylene is produced biologically through several pathways. In plants, it is synthesized from methionine via S-adenosylmethionine (SAM) and 1-aminocyclopropane-1-carboxylic acid (ACC), its immediate precursor. ACC synthase converts SAM into ACC, which is then converted into ethylene by ACC oxidase. The ACC oxidase reaction requires molecular oxygen, ferrous iron and ascorbate, and releases carbon dioxide and cyanide as coproducts.

Some microorganisms produce ethylene through pathways that do not involve ACC. In the bacterium Pseudomonas syringae, an ethylene-forming enzyme (EFE) catalyses the conversion of 2-oxoglutarate (α-ketoglutarate) into ethylene and carbon dioxide. This reaction requires molecular oxygen, ferrous iron and L-arginine. The enzyme also catalyses a separate reaction involving arginine hydroxylation and the conversion of 2-oxoglutarate into succinate and carbon dioxide.

Another microbial pathway proceeds through 2-keto-4-methylthiobutyric acid (KMBA), a derivative of methionine. Ethylene production through this route has been demonstrated in the yeast Cryptococcus albidus and the fungus Botrytis cinerea.

The EFE pathway has also been investigated for biotechnological ethylene production. Introducing the bacterial EFE gene into cyanobacteria, including Synechocystis sp. PCC 6803, enables photosynthetic ethylene production from carbon dioxide using light as the energy source. Sustained ethylene production for more than four months has been demonstrated using engineered Synechocystis sp. PCC 6803 immobilized in cellulose nanofiber-based films and cultivated in a continuous-flow photobiofilm reactor.

== Uses ==
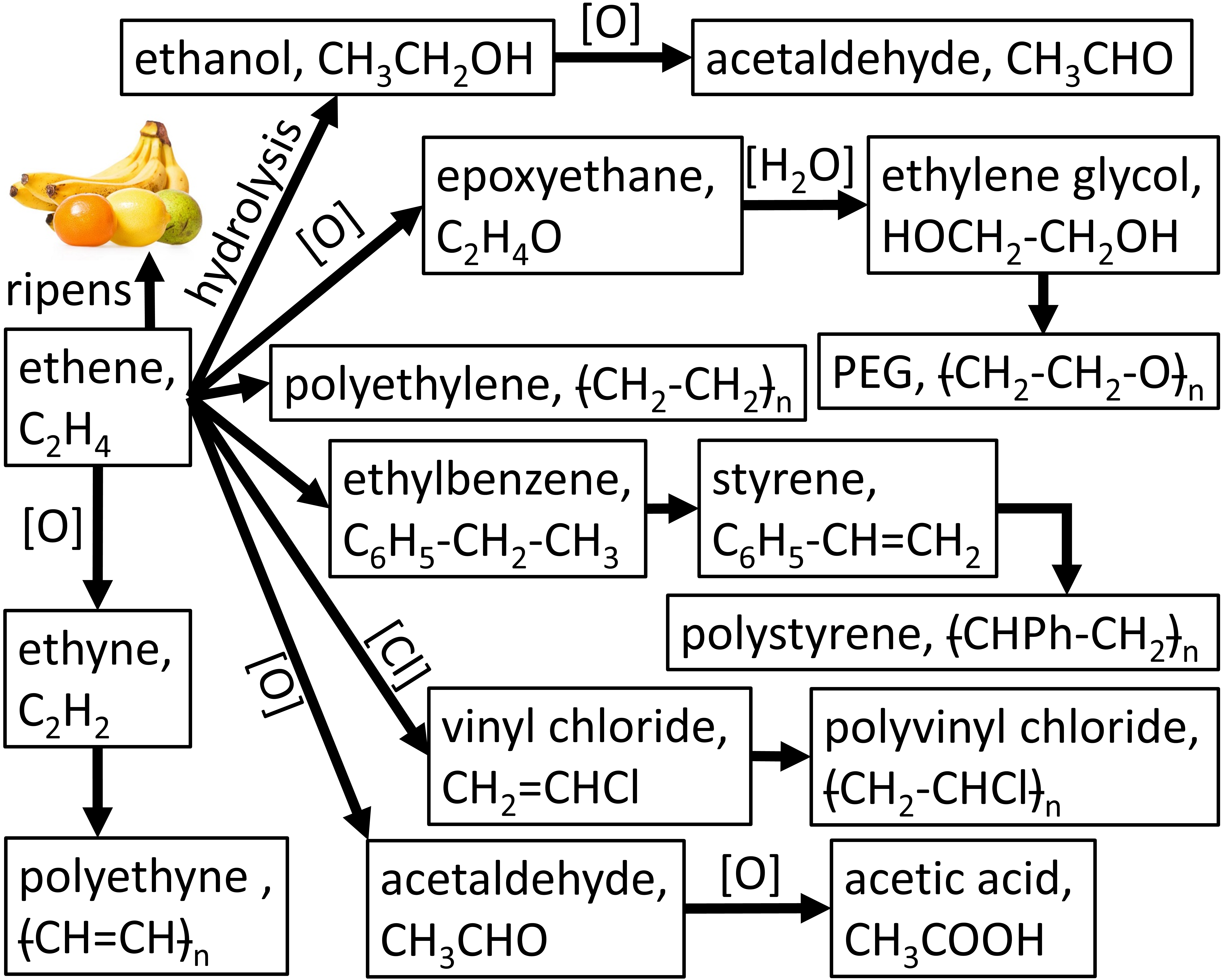
Diagram of uses of ethene

Major industrial reactions of ethylene include in order of scale: 1) polymerization, 2) oxidation, 3) halogenation and hydrohalogenation, 4) alkylation, 5) hydration, 6) oligomerization, and 7) hydroformylation. In the United States and Europe, approximately 90% of ethylene is used to produce ethylene oxide, ethylene dichloride, ethylbenzene and polyethylene.

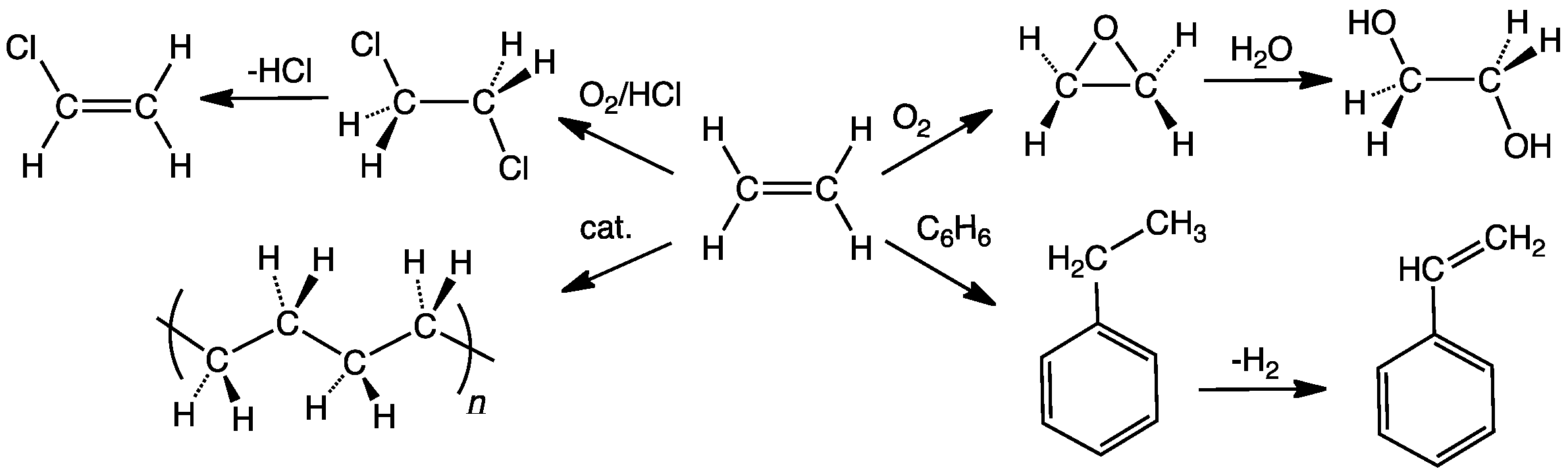
Main industrial uses of ethylene. Clockwise from the upper right: its conversions to ethylene oxide, precursor to ethylene glycol; to ethylbenzene, precursor to styrene; to various kinds of polyethylene; to ethylene dichloride, precursor to vinyl chloride.

=== Polymerization ===
Polyethylene production uses more than half of the world's ethylene supply. Polyethylene, also called polyethene and polythene, is the world's most widely used plastic. It is primarily used to make films in packaging, carrier bags and trash liners. Linear alpha-olefins, produced by oligomerization (formation of short-chain molecules) are used as precursors, detergents, plasticisers, synthetic lubricants, additives, and also as co-monomers in the production of polyethylenes.

=== Oxidation ===
Ethylene is oxidized to produce ethylene oxide, a key raw material in the production of surfactants and ethylene glycol.

Ethylene oxidation in the presence of a palladium catalyst can form acetaldehyde. This conversion once was a major industrial process. The process proceeds via the complexation of ethylene to a Pd(II) center.

=== Halogenation and hydrohalogenation ===
The halogenation of ethylene gives ethylene dichloride. The handling of chlorine entails "oxychlorination". Some products derived from this group are polyvinyl chloride, trichloroethylene, perchloroethylene, polyvinylidene chloride, and copolymers.

=== Alkylation ===
A major chemical intermediate from alkylation of ethylene is ethylbenzene, precursor to styrene. Styrene is used principally in polystyrene for packaging and insulation, as well as in styrene-butadiene rubber for tires and footwear. Smaller scale intermediates include ethyltoluene and alkylaluminium compounds. Products of these intermediates include polystyrene, unsaturated polyesters and ethylene-propylene terpolymers.

=== Oxo reaction ===
Ethylene is a precursor to propionic acid by the hydrocarboxylation using nickel carbonyl as the catalyst:

=== Hydration ===
Ethylene has long represented the major non-fermentative precursor to ethanol. The original method entailed its conversion to diethyl sulfate, followed by hydrolysis. The main method practiced since the mid-1990s is the direct hydration of ethylene catalyzed by solid acid catalysts:

C_{2}H_{4} + H_{2}O → CH_{3}CH_{2}OH

=== Dimerization to butenes ===
Ethylene is dimerized by hydrovinylation to give n-butenes using processes licensed by Lummus or IFP. The Lummus process produces mixed n-butenes (primarily 2-butenes) while the IFP process produces 1-butene. 1-Butene is used as a comonomer in the production of certain kinds of polyethylene.

=== Fruit and flowering ===
Ethylene is a hormone that affects the ripening and flowering of many plants. It is widely used to control freshness in horticulture and fruits. The scrubbing of naturally occurring ethylene delays ripening. Harvested fruit bound for shipping are often stored in oxygen-controlled environments as well as use of absorbents like zeolites to reduce the speed of ripening reaction.

== Ligand ==
Chlorobis(ethylene)rhodium dimer is a well-studied complex of ethylene.

Ethylene is a fundamental ligand in transition metal alkene complexes. One of the first organometallic compounds, Zeise's salt is a complex of ethylene. Useful reagents containing ethylene include Pt(PPh_{3})_{2}(C_{2}H_{4}) and Rh_{2}Cl_{2}(C_{2}H_{4})_{4}. The Rh-catalysed hydroformylation of ethylene is conducted on an industrial scale to provide propionaldehyde.

== History ==
Ethylene appears to have been discovered by Johann Joachim Becher, who obtained it by heating ethanol with sulfuric acid; he mentioned the gas in his Physica Subterranea (1669). Joseph Priestley also mentions the gas in his Experiments and observations relating to the various branches of natural philosophy: with a continuation of the observations on air (1779), where he reports that Jan Ingenhousz saw ethylene synthesized in the same way by a Mr. Enée in Amsterdam in 1777 and that Ingenhousz subsequently produced the gas himself. The properties of ethylene were studied in 1795 by four Dutch chemists, Johann Rudolph Deimann, Adrien Paets van Troostwyck, Anthoni Lauwerenburgh and Nicolas Bondt, who found that it differed from hydrogen gas and that it contained both carbon and hydrogen. This group also discovered that ethylene could be combined with chlorine to produce the Dutch oil, 1,2-dichloroethane; this discovery gave ethylene the name used for it at that time, olefiant gas (oil-making gas.) The term olefiant gas is in turn the etymological origin of the modern word "olefin", the class of hydrocarbons in which ethylene is the first member.

In the mid-19th century, the suffix -ene (an Ancient Greek root added to the end of female names meaning "daughter of") was widely used to refer to a molecule or part thereof that contained one fewer hydrogen atoms than the molecule being modified. Thus, ethylene (C_{2}H_{4}) was the "daughter of ethyl" (C_{2}H_{5}). The name ethylene was used in this sense as early as 1852.

In 1866, the German chemist August Wilhelm von Hofmann proposed a system of hydrocarbon nomenclature in which the suffixes -ane, -ene, -ine, -one, and -une were used to denote the hydrocarbons with 0, 2, 4, 6, and 8 fewer hydrogens than their parent alkane. In this system, ethylene became ethene. Hofmann's system eventually became the basis for the Geneva nomenclature approved by the International Congress of Chemists in 1892, which remains at the core of the IUPAC nomenclature. However, by that time, the name ethylene was deeply entrenched, and it remains in wide use today, especially in the chemical industry.

Following experimentation by Luckhardt, Crocker, and Carter at the University of Chicago, ethylene was used as an anesthetic. It remained in use through the 1940s, even while chloroform was being phased out.

=== Nomenclature ===
The 1979 IUPAC nomenclature rules made an exception for retaining the non-systematic name ethylene; however, this decision was reversed in the 1993 rules, and it remains unchanged in the newest 2013 recommendations, so the IUPAC name is now ethene. In the IUPAC system, the name ethylene is reserved for the divalent group -CH_{2}CH_{2}-. Hence, names like ethylene oxide and ethylene dibromide are permitted, but the use of the name ethylene for the two-carbon alkene is not. Nevertheless, use of the name ethylene for H_{2}C=CH_{2} (and propylene for H_{2}C=CHCH_{3}) is still prevalent among chemists in North America.

== Safety ==
Like all hydrocarbons, ethylene is a combustible asphyxiant. It is listed as an IARC group 3 agent, since there is no current evidence that it causes cancer in humans.

== See also ==
- RediRipe, an ethylene detector for fruits.
