= Ionic liquid piston compressor =

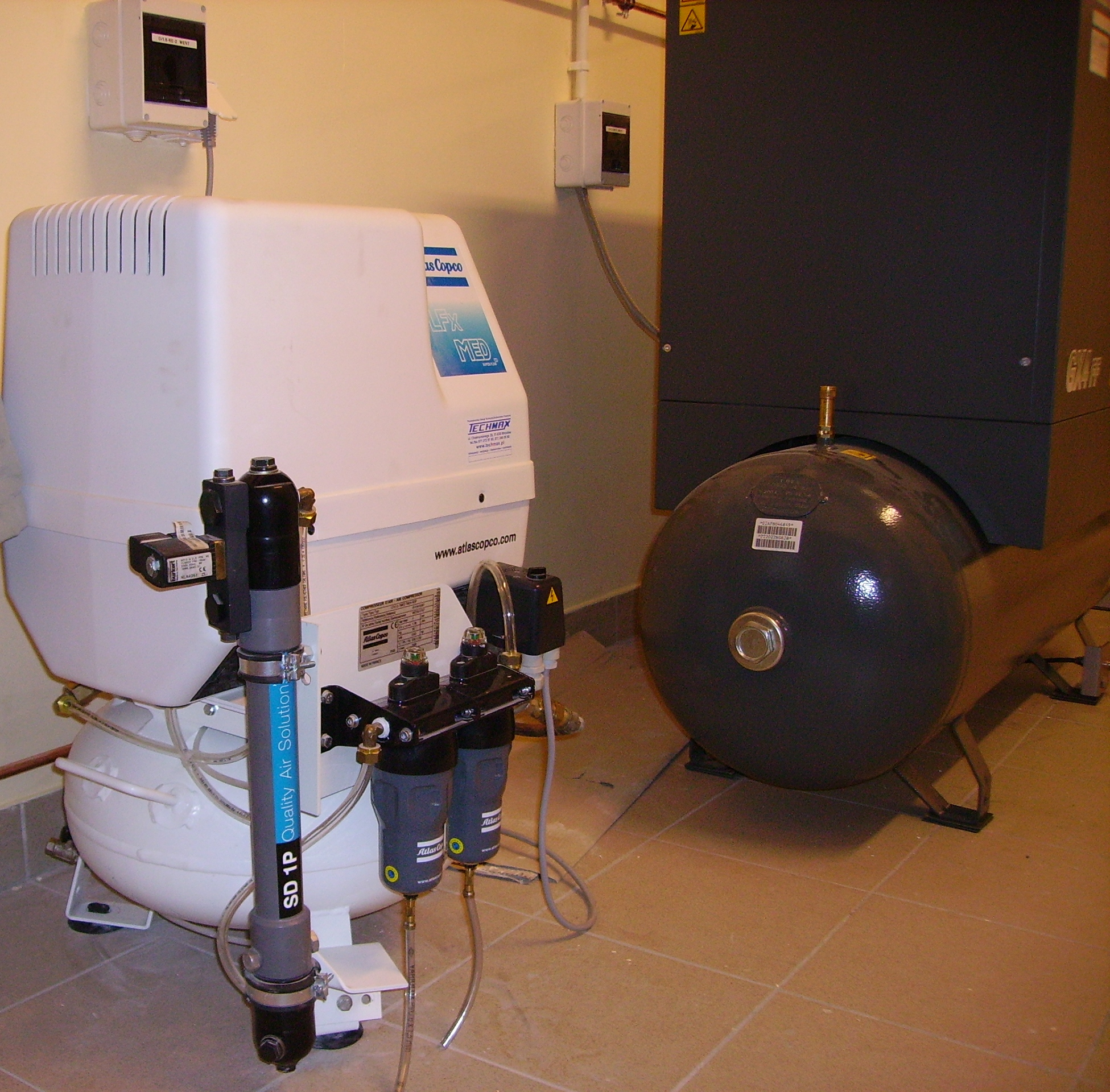
Piston Compressor

An ionic liquid piston compressor, ionic compressor or ionic liquid piston pump is a hydrogen compressor based on an ionic liquid piston instead of a metal piston as in a piston-metal diaphragm compressor.

== Principle ==
An ionic liquid compressor takes advantage of two properties of ionic liquids—their virtually non-measurable vapor pressures and large temperature window for the liquid phase—in combination with the low solubility of some gases (e.g. hydrogen) in them. This insolubility is exploited by using the body of an ionic liquid to compress hydrogen up to 1000 bar (14,500 psi) in hydrogen filling stations. Linde's ionic liquid compressor reduced the number of moving parts from about 500 in a conventional reciprocating compressor down to 8.

Many seals and bearings were removed in the design as the ionic liquid does not mix with the gas. Service life is about 10 times longer than a regular reciprocating compressor with reduced maintenance during use, energy costs are reduced by as much as 20%. The heat exchangers that are used in a normal piston compressor are removed as the heat is removed in the cylinder itself where it is generated. Almost 100% of the energy going into the process is being used with little energy wasted as reject heat.

Not to be confused with the ion pump or the ionic liquid ring pump.

== History ==
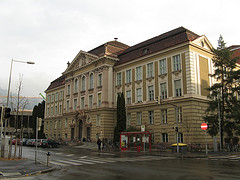
University Of Leoben

After the renewed interest in ionic liquids, research was done by proionic, an enterprise in the spin-off center "ZAT Center for applied Technology" of the University of Leoben. The system was demonstrated at Zemships.

== See also ==
- Electrochemical hydrogen compressor
- Guided rotor compressor
- Hydride compressor
- Linear compressor
- Ganzair Compressor
- Timeline of hydrogen technologies
