= Electrochemical hydrogen compressor =

An electrochemical hydrogen compressor is a hydrogen compressor where hydrogen is supplied to the anode, and compressed hydrogen is collected at the cathode with an exergy efficiency up to and even beyond 80% for pressures up to 10,000 psi or 700 bars.

== Principle ==
Diagram 1. Low pressure hydrogen separates into protons and electrons at the anode and the protons are electrochemically driven across the PEM to re-combine at the cathode — producing hydrogen under pressure.

A multi-stage electrochemical hydrogen compressor incorporates membrane-electrode-assemblies (MEAs) separated by proton exchange membranes (PEMs) in series to reach higher pressures, when a current is passed through the MEA protons and electrons are generated at the anode. The protons are electrochemically driven across the membrane to the cathode, after which they combine with the rerouted electrons to form hydrogen, which is fed to the hydrogen compressor to be oxidized at the anode of each cell to form protons and electrons.

This type of compressor has no moving parts and is compact. With electrochemical compression of hydrogen a pressure of 14500 psi (1000 bar) is achieved, this world record was set by HyET from the Netherlands in 2011. Water vapor partial pressure, current density, operating temperature and hydrogen back diffusion due to the pressure gradient have an effect on the maximum output pressure.

== Applications ==
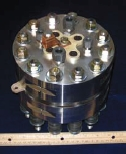

Electrochemical hydrogen compressors have been proposed for use in hydrogen refueling stations to pressurize hydrogen gas for storage. They have also been applied into novel refrigeration systems to pressurize hydrogen for absorption into metal hydrides or to pressurize other working fluids (such as refrigerants) as demonstrated by Xergy Inc. winners of the global GE's Ecomagination awards for 2011. These electrochemical compressors are noiseless, scalable, modular and highly efficient without the use of CFC's.

== See also ==
- Guided rotor compressor
- Hydride compressor
- Ionic liquid piston compressor
- Gas diffusion electrode
- Linear compressor
- Timeline of hydrogen technologies
- Concentration cell
- Work (thermodynamics)
