= Hydrogen compressor =

Device to increase pressure of hydrogen gas

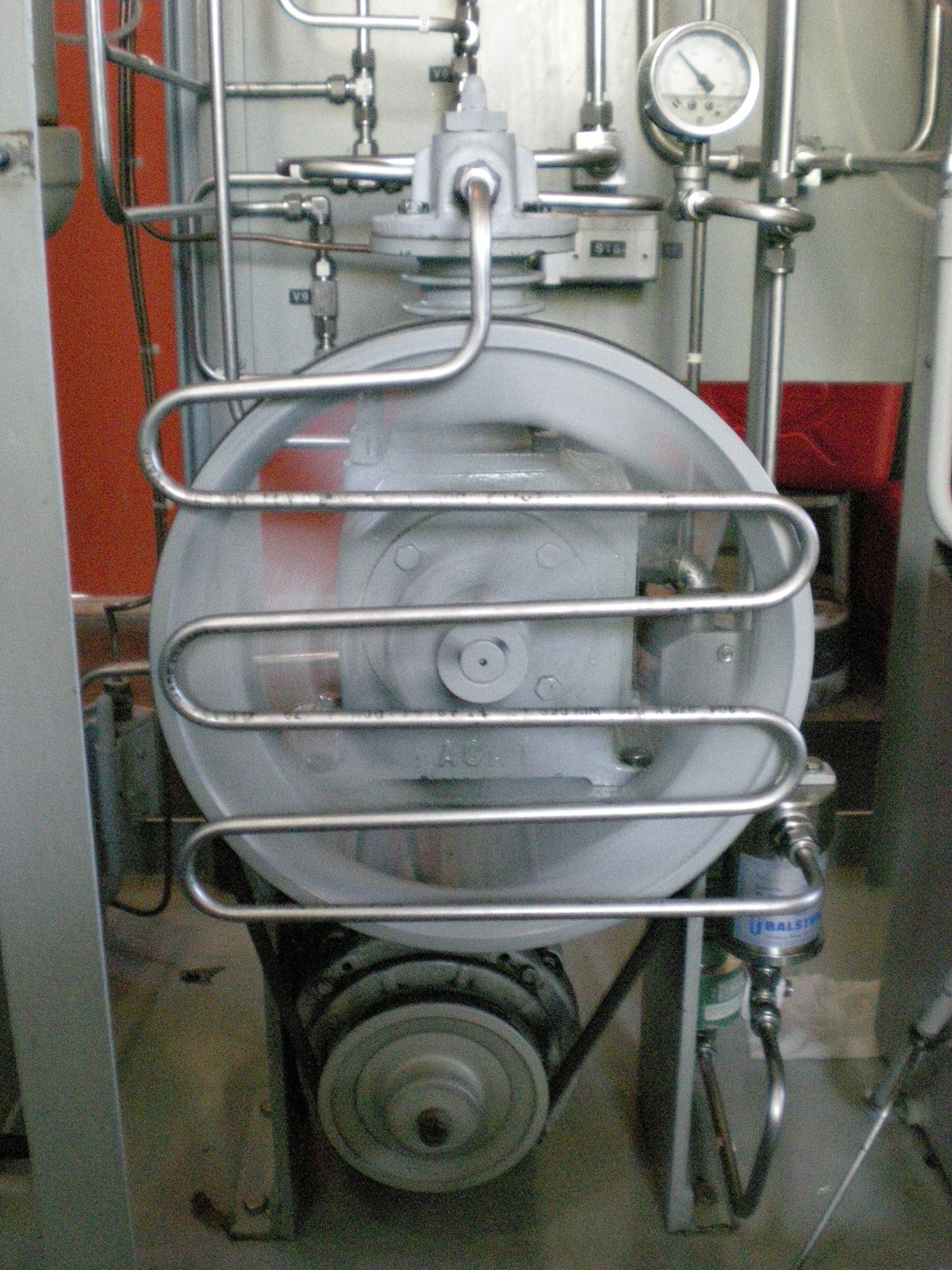
Compressor pump in operation. Pumping and comprssing hydrogen from the low pressure tank to the high pressure tank.

A hydrogen compressor is a device that increases the pressure of hydrogen by reducing its volume resulting in compressed hydrogen or liquid hydrogen.

Traditionally, applications for hydrogen compressors included Chlorine electrolyser and many chemical applications like the production of hydrogen peroxide (HPPO). The newer applications related to green and environmentally friendly technologies include fuel cells and electrolysis for hydrogen production.

== Compressor vs pump ==
Hydrogen compressors are closely related to hydrogen pumps and gas compressors: both increase the pressure on a fluid and both can transport the fluid through a pipe. As gases are compressible, the compressor also reduces the volume of hydrogen gas, whereas the main result of a pump raising the pressure of a liquid is to allow the liquid hydrogen to be transported elsewhere.

== Types ==
=== Reciprocating piston compressors ===
A proven method to compress hydrogen is to apply reciprocating piston compressors. Widely used in refineries, they are the backbone of refining crude oil. Reciprocating piston compressors are commonly available as either oil-lubricated or non-lubricated; for high pressure (350 - 700 bar), non-lubricated compressors are preferred to avoid oil contamination of the hydrogen. Typical drive power is in the order of magnitude of Megawatts (300kW-15MW). Expert know-how on piston sealing and packing rings can ensure that reciprocating compressors outperform the competing technologies in terms of MTBO (Mean Time Between Overhaul).

=== Ionic liquid piston compressor ===
An ionic liquid piston compressor is a hydrogen compressor based on an ionic liquid piston instead of a metal piston as in a piston-metal diaphragm compressor.

=== Electrochemical hydrogen compressor ===
A multi-stage electrochemical hydrogen compressor incorporates a series of membrane-electrode-assemblies (MEAs), similar to those used in proton-exchange membrane fuel cells; this type of compressor has no moving parts and is compact. The electrochemical compressor works similar to a fuel cell, a voltage is applied to the membrane and the resulting electric current pulls hydrogen through the membrane. With electrochemical compression of hydrogen, a pressure of 14500 psi (1000bar or 100MPa) is achieved. A patent is pending claiming an exergy efficiency of 70 to 80% for pressures up to 10,000 psi or 700 bars. A single stage electrochemical compression to 800 bar was reported in 2011.

=== Hydride compressor ===
In a hydride compressor, thermal and pressure properties of a hydride are used to absorb low-pressure hydrogen gas at ambient temperatures and then release high-pressure hydrogen gas at higher temperatures; the bed of hydride is heated with hot water or an electric coil.

=== Piston-metal diaphragm compressor ===
Piston-metal diaphragm compressors are stationary high-pressure compressors, four-staged water-cooled, 11–15 kW, 30–50 Nm3/h 40 MPa for dispensation of hydrogen. Since compression generates heat, the compressed gas is to be cooled between stages making the compression less adiabatic and more isothermal. The default assumption on diaphragm hydrogen compressors is an adiabatic efficiency of 70%. Used in hydrogen stations.

=== Guided rotor compressor ===
The guided rotor compressor (GRC) is a positive-displacement rotary compressor based upon an envoluted trochoid geometry which utilizes a parallel trochoid curve to define its basic compression volume. It has a typical 80 to 85% adiabatic efficiency.

=== Linear compressor ===
The single-piston linear compressor uses dynamic counterbalancing, where an auxiliary movable mass is flexibly attached to a movable piston assembly and to the stationary compressor casing using auxiliary mechanical springs with zero vibration export at minimum electrical power and current consumed by the motor. It is used in cryogenics

== See also ==
- Compressed hydrogen – Gaseous state of the element hydrogen kept under pressure
- Hydrogen turboexpander-generator
- High-pressure electrolysis
- Hydrogen embrittlement – Reduction in ductility of a metal exposed to hydrogen
- Hydrogen tank – Container for hydrogen storage
- Hydrogen leak testing
