= Hydride compressor =

Hydrogen compressor based on absorption and desorption of hydrogen

A hydride compressor is a hydrogen compressor based on metal hydrides with absorption of hydrogen at low pressure, releasing heat, and desorption of hydrogen at high pressure, absorbing heat, by raising the temperature with an external heat source like a heated waterbed or electric coil.

Advantages of the hydride compressor are the high volumetric density, no moving parts, simplicity in design and operation, the possibility to consume waste heat instead of electricity and reversible absorption/desorption, disadvantages are the high cost of the metal hydride and weight.

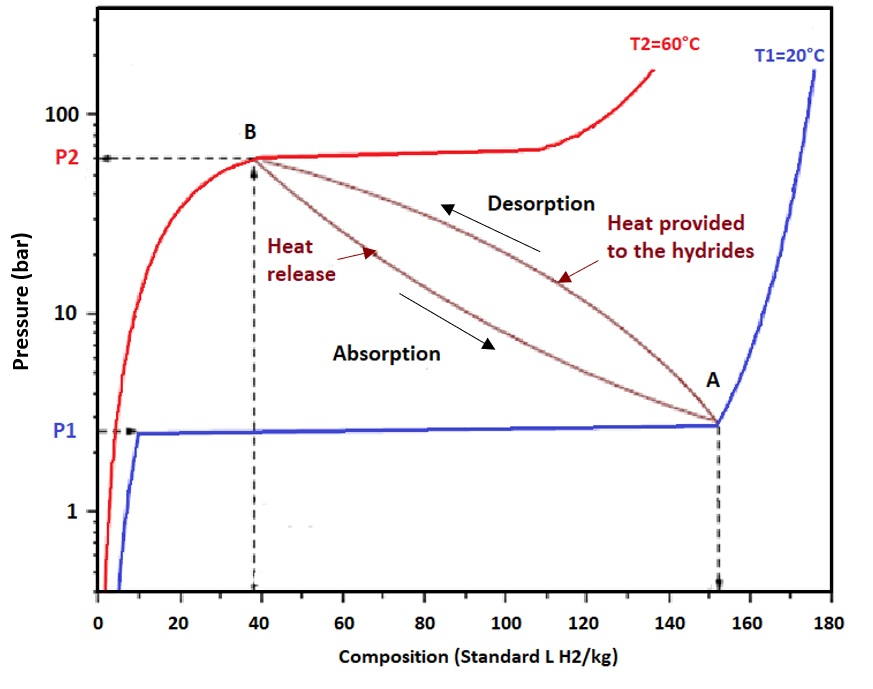
Thermodynamic compression cycle of hydride compressor

== History ==
The first applications of metal hydrides were made by NASA to demonstrate long-term hydrogen storage for use in space propulsion. In the 1970s, automobiles, vans, and forklifts were demonstrated. The metal hydrides were used for hydrogen storage, separation, and refrigeration. An example of current use are hydrogen sorption cryocoolers and portable metal hydride compressors.

== See also ==
- Electrochemical hydrogen compressor
- Guided-rotor compressor – Type of positive-displacement rotary gas compressor
- Hydrogen storage – Methods of storing hydrogen for later use
- Ionic liquid piston compressor
- Linear compressor – Gas compressor where the piston is driven by a linear actuator
- Sodium aluminium hydride
- Timeline of hydrogen technologies
