= Hymatic =

British manufacturer of heat exchangers

Hymatic, also known as Hymatic Engineering, are a British manufacturer of heat exchangers, fluid control technology and cryogenic systems as part of an aircraft's environmental control system (ECS), headquartered in Worcestershire.

== History ==
The company was founded on 27 September 1937.

It began making air compressors (pneumatics), anti-g valves, pressure reducing valves, stop valves and fuel system relief valves. Most well-known British aircraft in the 1950s and 1960s contained their valves and pneumatic equipment.

It developed the fuel system for Concorde. Concorde carried around 22,000 gallons of fuel. Concorde's fuel system had to overcome boiling of fuel at high altitudes.

In 2002, the company had a turnover of £21.7m.

=== Research ===
It has worked with the Cryogenic Engineering Group at the University of Oxford, in making linear compressors.

=== Ownership ===
The company was bought by Honeywell in February 2004, with the case referred to the Office of Fair Trading (OFT).

== Structure ==
It is situated on the Moon's Moat Industrial Estate in Redditch. The company is registered with the British Cryogenics Council.

== Products ==
- Anti-ice valves
- Cryocoolers for infrared sensors
- Stored energy systems
