= Lewis H. Nash =

American politician (c. 1852–1923)

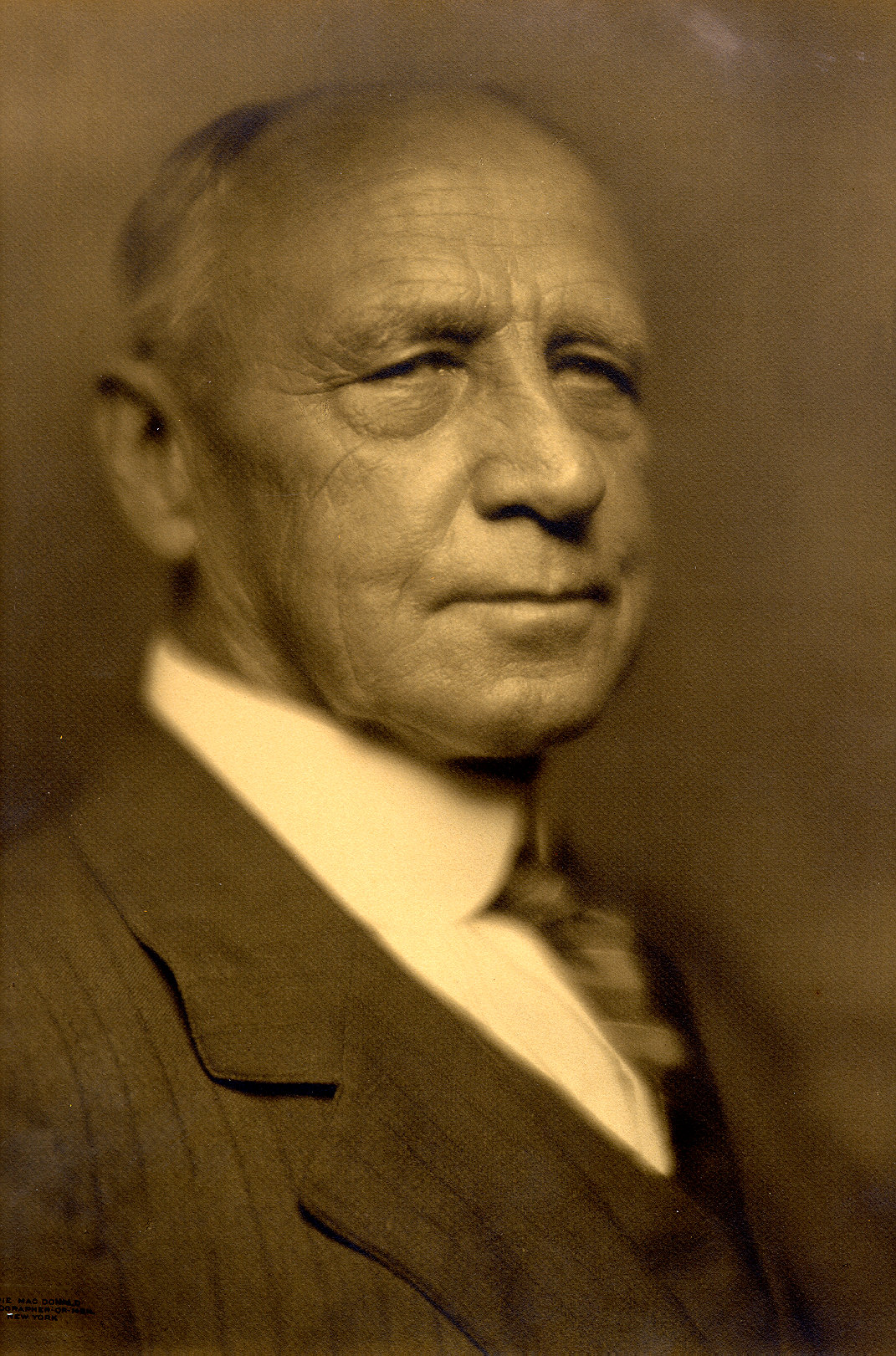
- Born: c. 1852
- Died: November 17, 1923 (aged 70–71)
- Education: Stevens Institute of Technology, Master of Engineering in Mechanical engineering
- Occupation: Mechanical engineer
- Engineering career
- Discipline: Mechanical
- Significant design: Liquid ring vacuum pump
- Awards: Doctor of Engineering (h.c.)

Member of the Connecticut House of Representatives from Norwalk
- In office 1923–1925 Serving with Frank Gregory
- Preceded by: Harvey Kent, Samuel Watkins
- Succeeded by: Freeman Light, Harvey Kent

Lewis H. Nash (c. 1852 – November 11, 1923) was an American engineer who invented the liquid-ring-vacuum pump, and was the holder of over a hundred United States patents for pumps, engines, and other equipment. He founded the Nash Engineering Company in 1905, and served as a member of the Connecticut House of Representatives.

== Education and early career ==
Nash completed his public school education in South Norwalk, Connecticut, in 1869. As his parents were unable to pay for college, he took an apprenticeship course as a machinist at the Norwalk Iron Works. He next enrolled at a new institution, the Stevens Institute of Technology, which offered courses in the new field of Mechanical Engineering. He joined its third class, and graduated as class valedictorian.

Nash initially found his apprenticeship was of greater value in securing work than his degree, so he worked as a machinist in New Haven, Connecticut. In the meantime, he continued to work on a design he had conceived while in college for a new type of water measuring device. He built a model and took it to the National Meter Company of Brooklyn, New York. Though the device did not work satisfactorily in a test, its merits were appreciated, and he was employed with instructions to perfect the meter.

== Water meters ==
In a few months, Nash produced the "Crown" meter, the first of a large class of single-piston rotary meters, which practically superseded all other forms of water meters at that time. He received over sixty patents for water meters.

One type of meter, the "Gem", was built in sizes up to 36 inches (910 mm). The quantity of water that could be delivered by such a meter was nearly 500,000 US gallons per hour (1,900 m^{3}/h). This presented a problem in testing, as that amount of water could never be taken from the water supply of any city. In fact, a single meter of that size would pass enough water to supply a large town. Nash was given the task of devising a testing plant which re-circulated the water. He accomplished this by the use of a vertical screw pump which lifts the water to a reservoir, from which it passes through the meter to be tested and thence over a weir, where it is measured. The device and the meters both proved to be accurate.

== Gas engines ==
After seven years at the National Meter Company, Nash began the study of the gas engine and subsequently received sixty or more patents covering their design and operation. Many of them were extensively used by engine manufacturers, including the two cycle engine with piston controlled valves. Another patent covered the starting of gas engines by the use of compressed air, and this feature was adopted by all makes of large gas engines. The National Meter Company built the Nash engine in sizes up to about 400 horsepower (300 kW). These engines were used in municipal electric lighting and pumping plants as well as for general power purposes. Probably the largest installation of the Nash Engine was at the Phoenix Tube Company in Brooklyn, New York, and consisted of two Nash gas engines, totaling 500 horsepower (370 kW), operating on producer gas. The engines were directly connected to dynamos and although they operated under violently fluctuating load conditions, they ran well, both in regulation and economy modes. The company claimed that the Nash gas engine running on producer gas, using anthracite buckwheat coal, was the most economical of power products, costing twenty cents per 100 horsepower-hours (75 kWh).

Nash became chief engineer of the company, but his relations with them were not the best. The company never prosecuted infringements of their gas engine patents, and Nash's efforts were mostly unappreciated, for those at the head of the business not only failed to push his developments, but continually curtailed his authority.

== Nash Engineering Company ==
When Nash conceived the idea of a new type of vacuum pumping equipment, he decided not to assign the patents to the National Meter Company, but to manufacture the product himself. This was the beginning of the Nash Engineering Company (NEC), which initially had its offices on the third floor of his residence. In 1905, two of his friends joined to become officers and directors of the new corporation.

After three years of designing and testing, manufacture was started at a factory over a shop on Water Street in South Norwalk. In 1911, Nash and his family moved to South Norwalk, and three years later he severed his connections with the National Meter Company to devote his entire time to his own firm. In 1909 Irving C. Jennings was hired part-time to help in testing pump technology, receiving pay in the form of company stock.

While rounding out a line of vacuum pumps and compressors and of creating a demand for the pumps was slow. A micrometer plug gauge, another invention of Nash's, was made and generated enough profits to keep the company afloat. In 1912, a steady demand had been found for the pumps, and the first floor of the present building on Wilson Point Road was erected. The building was designed and built entirely from his plans and figures of Nash.

In that year, Nash's eldest son Douglas graduated from Stevens Institute of Technology, and it was his first task to superintend the construction of the new factory. Two years later, Harold, Nash's other son, became affiliated with the NEC after graduating from Stevens. The five years from 1918 to his death on November 17, 1923, Nash saw his company grow to be a prosperous, well-established concern, and was he able spend most of his time in his laboratory, where he could work out his many inventions and ideas. After his death Irving C. Jennings appointed was president of the NEC. In 1949 Ben Nash graduated from the Rensselaer Polytechnic and joined the NEC full-time. In 1958 Douglas Nash took over as president of the company with Irving Jennings as honorary chairman of the board. On the retirement of Douglas and Harold Nash in 1962 Benjamin Nash was elected as company resident.

During World War I, he and his son, Harold, were working on an aeroplane engine which received favorable comment from the National Advisory Committee for Aeronautics and engineers such as Elmer Sperry, the inventor of the gyroscopic compass and stabilizing devices. The war ended before the engine was fully developed, and the idea was dropped.

During the early years, NASH developed vacuum stream heating systems and vacuum sewage collection systems for many of the growing USA cities. NASH also developed vacuum pumps which were applied in the manufacture of pulp and paper and in the sugar industry. During the mid-20th century, NASH continued expanding into industrial markets such as paper, power, petrochemical, general industrial and food markets.

=== International markets ===
Nash further expanded into international markets with manufacturing, sales and services centers throughout these regions.

- The Nash Engineering Co. of Canada, Ltd.
- Nash Engineering Company (Great Britain) Ltd.
- Nash do Brasil
- Nash International Company (NIC) organized |
- Nash-Hytor established in Sweden |
- Nash de Belgique
- Nash Korea office established

In 2002, Nash Engineering attracted private equity finance from Audax (Boston) and merged with Siemens to become Nash Elmo. A 2004 acquisition by Gardner Denver Inc. resulted in Gardner Denver Nash.

=== Publications ===
Some works published by the Nash Engineering Company include:

- Nash Vacuum Pump and Compressor Packages for Service Aboard Ship. Nash Engineering Company. 1973.
- Priming Centrifugal Pumps Aboard Ship: A Manual. Nash Engineering Company. 1951.
- Harold E. Adams (1937). Accurate Air Measurement by Nash Orifice Method. Nash Engineering Company.

== Public life ==
In 1922, Nash was elected to represent the city of Norwalk in the Connecticut House of Representatives. He was a Republican.

== Awards ==
In 1921, Nash's alma mater the Stevens Institute recognized his outstanding achievements by awarding him the degree of Doctor of Engineering (E.D.).
