= Discharge pressure =

Discharge pressure (also called high side pressure or head pressure) is the pressure generated on the output side of a gas compressor in a refrigeration or air conditioning system. Higher discharge pressure could result in increased energy consumption and due to that less efficiency. High discharge pressure is generally considered a negative except for the very rare cases where it can be used to achieve a certain pressure in the system. Additionally, higher discharge pressure can damage components. The discharge pressure is affected by several factors: size and speed of the condenser fan, ambient temperature, condition and cleanliness of the condenser coil, and the size of the discharge line. An extremely high discharge pressure coupled with an extremely low suction pressure is an indicator of a refrigerant restriction. High discharge pressure could result in multiple types of cavitation, including suction cavitation and discharge cavitation which can lead to reduced system efficiency, wear on components, increased noise and vibration and ultimately system failure. You can measure the discharge pressure of the system by installing a pressure gauge on the discharge line. Carefully monitoring the pressure can prevent component damage and failure.
