= Sertco =

Sertco Industries
- Type: Private
- Industry: Energy
- Founded: 1979
- Headquarters: Okemah, Oklahoma, United States
- Key people: CEO; Rick Crouch, President; Mikko Crouch, Chief Operating Officer; Joe Harrington, VP of Sales; Tony Vaughn; Director of Marketing; Matt Smith
- Products: Natural Gas
- Number of employees: 40
- Website: www.sertco.com

In April 1979, Sertco Industries, Inc. was incorporated for the purpose of general manufacturing and assembly as well as sales of machined parts. Operations began using the latest CNC machinery available at the time. As of 2015, the company employs 65 people and manufactures for multiple industries including aerospace and compressors.

== Aerospace Division ==
Sertco was among the first aerospace machine shops to use one-hundred 100 percent CNC machines, when manual milling machines were predominantly used.still the norm Customers Sertco worked with included Cessna, McDonnell Douglas, Boeing, the United States Department of Defense and others. The aerospace industry requires very specific weights and strengths in parts and components, and are made from aluminum billet, stainless steel or other high stress alloys.

== High Performance Division ==
In May 1984, Sertco developed an improved motorcycle engine cylinder for race applications that increased the reliability and maximum displacement available to racers.

Following the 'big block,' Sertco developed a shock absorbing rear sprocket that drastically reduced transmission breakage. The 'torsion sprocket received the "Murdoch Award" in 1993 as the year's most significant new product in the sport of motorcycle racing.

== Energy Division ==
The methods developed to support the aerospace and high performance industries led to the formation of the energy division in late 1997 which became Sertco's main focus.

The application of the technology from the aerospace and high performance divisions were deployed in the development of a reciprocating natural gas compressor. This represents a significant cost savings to small and medium size natural gas producers. One compressor design is based on the rotating assembly from the Chevrolet 350 (5.7L) automobile motor packaged in a split case horizontally opposed cylinder arrangement.

To date, over 1,000 units have been produced logging millions of hours of continuous service. Sertco utilizes several distributors and currently has units operating worldwide. Besides hundreds of units operating in the United States, many more are operating in Mexico, South America, Europe, Russia and Indonesia. Other emerging markets such as Australia are also being studied and investigated for their potential opportunities.

== Facility Expansions ==
In November 2005 and July 2010, Sertco expanded its operations adding a total of 60,000 square feet of additional fabrication and assembly area that include 4 separate manufacturing facilities. The additional space and staff have allowed the company to quadruple production rates from pre-expansion levels. Independent areas include a 9 machine CNC shop, weld and engine building, a 6 line (32 station) production building, as well as, a blast and paint booth and test loop area. A new load dock and automated paint and blast booths are in the works.
