= Nash Engineering Company =

The Nash Engineering Company, founded in 1905 in Norwalk, Connecticut, was a manufacturer of liquid ring vacuum pumps. In 2004, it was acquired by Gardner Denver Inc. resulted in Gardner Denver Nash.

== History ==
During the early years, NASH developed vacuum stream heating systems and vacuum sewage collection systems for many of the growing USA cities. NASH also developed vacuum pumps which were applied in the manufacture of pulp and paper and in the sugar industry. During the mid-20th century, NASH continued expanding into industrial markets such as paper, power, petrochemical, general industrial and food markets.

In 2002, Nash Engineering received private equity finance from Audax (Boston) and merged with Siemens to become Nash Elmo. In 2004, it was acquired by Gardner Denver Inc. resulted in Gardner Denver Nash.
