= Natterer compressor =

Type of manually operated air compression machine

A Natterer compressor was a type of air compression machine which was used in early experiments in making liquid oxygen (LOX) in the 1870s. A manually operated screw jack was utilized to compress air or other gases up to ~200 atm (~3000 psi).

The device was created by Johann Natterer, a student of Adolf Martin Pleischl, for experiments creating liquid carbonic acid.
