= Timeline of hydrogen technologies =

This is a timeline of the history of hydrogen technology.

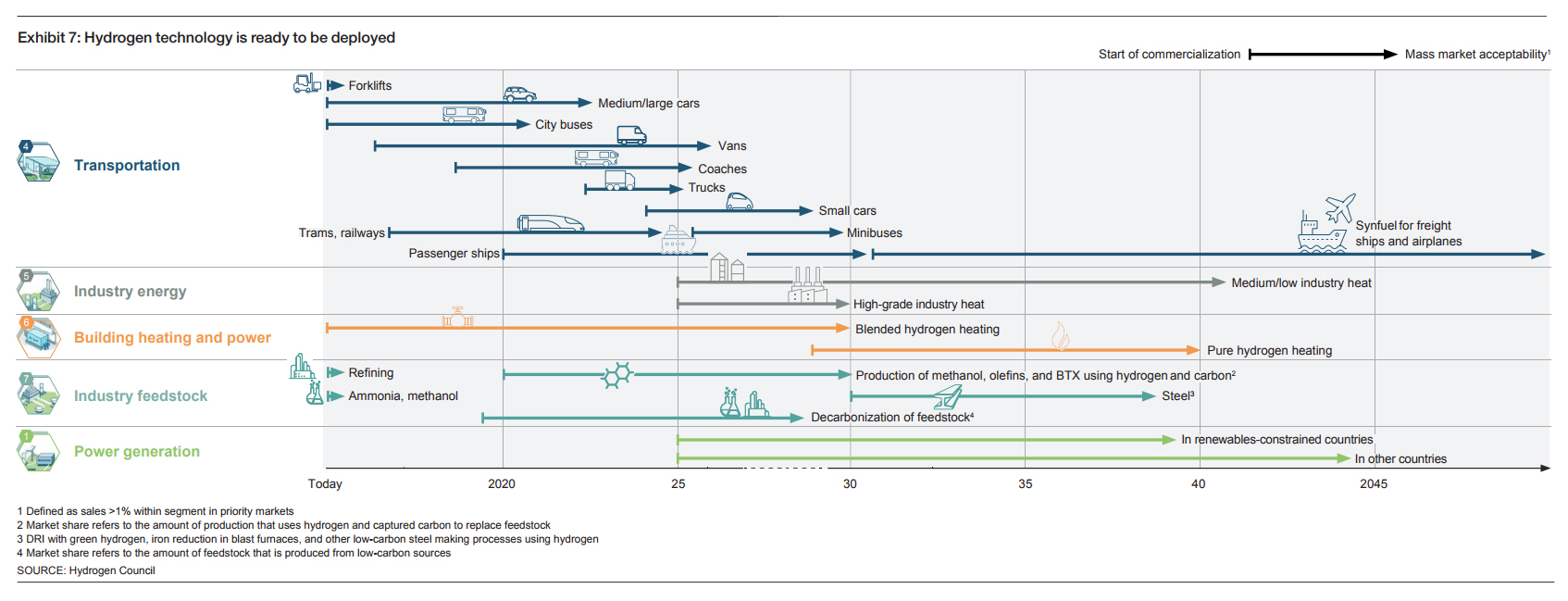
Timeline of future development of hydrogen technologies as a key enabler of the energy transition

== Timeline ==
=== 16th century ===
- c. 1520 – First recorded observation of hydrogen by Paracelsus through dissolution of metals (iron, zinc, and tin) in sulfuric acid.

=== 17th century ===
- 1650 – Turquet de Mayerne obtains a gas or "inflammable air" by the action of dilute sulphuric acid on iron.
- 1662 – Boyle's law (gas law relating pressure and volume).
- 1670 – Robert Boyle produces hydrogen by reacting metals with acid.
- 1672 – "New Experiments touching the Relation between Flame and Air" by Robert Boyle.
- 1679 – Denis Papin – safety valve.
- 1700 – Nicolas Lemery shows that the gas produced in the sulfuric acid/iron reaction is explosive in air.

=== 18th century ===
- 1755 – Joseph Black confirms that different gases exist. / Latent heat
- 1766 – Henry Cavendish publishes in "On Factitious Airs" a description of "dephlogisticated air" by reacting zinc metal with hydrochloric acid and isolates a gas 7 to 11 times lighter than air.
- 1774 – Joseph Priestley isolates and categorizes oxygen.
- 1780 – Felice Fontana discovers the water-gas shift reaction.
- 1783 – Jacques Charles makes the first flight with his hydrogen-filled gas balloon or Charlière.
- 1783 – Antoine Lavoisier and Pierre Laplace measure the heat of combustion of hydrogen using an ice calorimeter.
- 1784 – Jean-Pierre Blanchard attempts a dirigible hydrogen balloon, but it was unable to steer.
- 1784 – The invention of the Lavoisier Meusnier iron-steam process, generating hydrogen by passing water vapor over a bed of red-hot iron at 600 °C.
- 1785 – Jean-François Pilâtre de Rozier builds the hybrid Rozière balloon.
- 1787 – Louis-Bernard Guyton de Morveau and others give hydrogen its name (Gk: hydro = water, -genes = born of).
- 1787 – Charles's law (gas law, relating volume and temperature).
- 1789 – Jan Rudolph Deiman and Adriaan Paets van Troostwijk use an electrostatic machine and a Leyden jar for the first electrolysis of water.
- 1800 – William Nicholson and Anthony Carlisle break down water into hydrogen and oxygen by electrolysis with a voltaic pile.
- 1800 – Johann Wilhelm Ritter duplicates the experiment with a rearranged set of electrodes to collect the two gases separately.

=== 19th century ===
- 1801 – Humphry Davy discovers the concept of the fuel cell.
- 1806 – François Isaac de Rivaz builds the de Rivaz engine, the first internal combustion engine powered by a mixture of hydrogen and oxygen.
- 1809 – Thomas Forster observes with a theodolite the drift of small free pilot balloons filled with "inflammable gas".
- 1809 – Gay-Lussac's law, a gas law relating temperature and pressure.
- 1811 – Avogadro's law, a gas law relating volume and amount of substance.
- 1819 – Edward Daniel Clarke invents the hydrogen gas blowpipe.
- 1820 – W. Cecil writes a letter, "On the application of hydrogen gas to produce a moving power in machinery".
- 1823 – Goldsworthy Gurney demonstrates limelight.
- 1823 – Döbereiner's Lamp, a lighter invented by Johann Wolfgang Döbereiner.
- 1823 – Goldsworthy Gurney devises an oxy-hydrogen blowpipe.
- 1824 – Michael Faraday invents the rubber balloon.
- 1826 – Thomas Drummond builds the Drummond Light.
- 1826 – Samuel Brown tests his internal combustion engine by using it to propel a vehicle up Shooter's Hill.
- 1834 – Michael Faraday publishes Faraday's laws of electrolysis.
- 1834 – Benoît Paul Émile Clapeyron – Ideal gas law.
- 1836 – John Frederic Daniell invents a primary cell in which hydrogen is eliminated in the generation of the electricity.
- 1839 – Christian Friedrich Schönbein publishes the principle of the fuel cell in the "Philosophical Magazine".
- 1839 – William Robert Grove develops the Grove cell.
- 1842 – William Robert Grove develops the first fuel cell (which he calls the gas voltaic battery).
- 1849 – Eugène Bourdon – Bourdon gauge (manometer).
- 1863 – Etienne Lenoir makes a test drive from Paris to Joinville-le-Pont with the 1-cylinder, 2-stroke Hippomobile running on coal gas.
- 1866 – August Wilhelm von Hofmann invents the Hofmann voltameter for the electrolysis of water.
- 1873 – Thaddeus S. C. Lowe – water gas; the process uses the water gas shift reaction.
- 1874 – Jules Verne – The Mysterious Island: "Yes, my friends, I believe that water will one day be employed as fuel, that hydrogen and oxygen which constitute it, used singly or together, will furnish an inexhaustible source of heat and light, of an intensity of which coal is not capable."
- 1884 – Charles Renard and Arthur Constantin Krebs launch the airship La France.
- 1885 – Zygmunt Florenty Wróblewski publishes hydrogen's critical temperature as 33 K; critical pressure, 13.3 atmospheres; and boiling point, 23 K.
- 1889 – Ludwig Mond and Carl Langer coin the name fuel cell and try to build one running on air and Mond gas.
- 1893 – Friedrich Wilhelm Ostwald experimentally determines the interconnected roles of the various components of the fuel cell.
- 1895 – Hydrolysis.
- 1896 – Jackson D.D. and Ellms J.W., hydrogen production by microalgae (Anabaena).
- 1896 – Leon Teisserenc de Bort carries out experiments with high flying instrumental weather balloons.
- 1897 – Paul Sabatier facilitates the use of hydrogenation with the discovery of the Sabatier reaction.
- 1898 – James Dewar liquefies hydrogen by using regenerative cooling and his invention, the vacuum flask at the Royal Institution of Great Britain in London.
- 1899 – James Dewar collects solid hydrogen for the first time.
- 1900 – Count Ferdinand von Zeppelin launches the first hydrogen-filled Zeppelin LZ1 airship (the first successful rigid airship).

=== 20th century ===
- 1901 – Wilhelm Normann introduces the hydrogenation of fats.
- 1903 – Konstantin Eduardovich Tsiolkovsky publishes "The Exploration of Cosmic Space by Means of Reaction Devices".
- 1907 – Lane hydrogen producer.
- 1909 – Count Ferdinand Adolf August von Zeppelin make the first long distance flight with the Zeppelin LZ5.
- 1909 – Linde–Frank–Caro process.
- 1910 – The first Zeppelin passenger flight with the Zeppelin LZ7.
- 1910 – Fritz Haber patents the Haber process.
- 1912 – The first scheduled international Zeppelin passenger flights with the Zeppelin LZ13.
- 1913 – Niels Bohr explains the Rydberg formula for the spectrum of hydrogen by imposing a quantization condition on classical orbits of the electron in hydrogen.
- 1919 – The first Atlantic crossing by airship with the Beardmore HMA R34.
- 1920 – Hydrocracking, a plant for the commercial hydrogenation of brown coal is commissioned at Leuna in Germany.
- 1923 – Steam reforming, the first synthetic methanol is produced by BASF in Leuna.
- 1923 – J. B. S. Haldane envisions in Daedalus; or, Science and the Future "great power stations where during windy weather the surplus power will be used for the electrolytic decomposition of water into oxygen and hydrogen".
- 1926 – Wolfgang Pauli and Erwin Schrödinger show that the Rydberg formula for the spectrum of hydrogen follows from the new quantum mechanics.
- 1926 – Partial oxidation, Vandeveer and Parr at the University of Illinois use oxygen in the place of air for the production of syngas.
- 1926 – Cyril Norman Hinshelwood describes the phenomenon of chain reaction.
- 1926 – Umberto Nobile makes the first flight over the North Pole with the hydrogen airship Norge.
- 1929 – Paul Harteck and Karl Friedrich Bonhoeffer achieve the first synthesis of pure parahydrogen.
- 1929 – The hydrogen-filled LZ 127 Graf Zeppelin makes a 33,234 km (20,651 mi; 17,945 nmi) circumnavigation of the world. It is the first and only airship to do so, and the second circumnavigation of the globe by air. The voyage took a total of 21 days, 5 hours, and 31 minutes.
- 1930 – Rudolf Erren – Erren engine – patent CH148238A – Improvements in and relating to internal combustion engines using a mixture of hydrogen and oxygen as fuel.
- 1935 – Eugene Wigner and H.B. Huntington predict metallic hydrogen.
- 1937 – The Zeppelin LZ 129 Hindenburg is destroyed by fire.
- 1937 – The Heinkel HeS 1 experimental gaseous hydrogen-fueled centrifugal jet engine is tested at Hirth in March – the first working jet engine.
- 1937 – The first hydrogen-cooled turbogenerator goes into service at Dayton, Ohio.
- 1938 – The first 240 km hydrogen pipeline Rhine-Ruhr.
- 1938 – Igor Sikorsky from Sikorsky Aircraft proposes liquid hydrogen as a fuel.
- 1939 – Rudolf Erren – Erren engine – US patent 2,183,674 – Internal combustion engine using hydrogen as fuel.
- 1939 – Hans Gaffron discovers that algae can switch between producing oxygen and hydrogen.
- 1941 – The first mass application of hydrogen in internal combustion engines: Russian lieutenant Boris Shelishch in the besieged Leningrad converts some hundreds cars "GAZ-AA" which serve posts of barrage balloons of air defense.
- 1943 – Liquid hydrogen is tested as rocket fuel at Ohio State University.
- 1943 – Arne Zetterström describes hydrox.
- 1947 – Willis Lamb and Robert Retherford measure the small energy shift (the Lamb shift) between the ^{2}S_{1/2} and ^{2}P_{1/2} orbitals of hydrogen, providing a great stimulus to the development of quantum electrodynamics.
- 1949 – Hydrodesulfurization (catalytic reforming) is commercialized under the name "platforming process".
- 1951 – Underground hydrogen storage.
- 1952 – Ivy Mike, the first successful test of a nuclear explosive based on hydrogen (actually, deuterium) fusion.
- 1952 – Non-refrigerated transport Dewar.
- 1955 – W. Thomas Grubb modifies the fuel cell design by using a sulphonated polystyrene ion-exchange membrane as the electrolyte.
- 1957 – Pratt & Whitney's model 304 jet engine using liquid hydrogen as fuel tested for the first time as part of the Lockheed CL-400 Suntan project.
- 1957 – The specifications for the U-2 a double axle liquid hydrogen semi-trailer are issued.
- 1958 – Leonard Niedrach devises a way of depositing platinum onto the membrane, known as the Grubb-Niedrach fuel cell.
- 1958 – Allis-Chalmers demonstrates the D 12, the first 15 kW fuel cell tractor.
- 1959 – Francis Thomas Bacon builds the Bacon Cell, the first practical 5 kW hydrogen-air fuel cell to power a welding machine.
- 1960 – Allis-Chalmers builds the first fuel cell forklift.
- 1961 – RL10 liquid hydrogen-fuelled rocket engine first flight.
- 1964 – Allis-Chalmers builds a 750-watt fuel cell to power a one-man underwater research vessel.
- 1965 – The first commercial use of a fuel cell in Project Gemini.
- 1965 – Allis-Chalmers builds the first fuel cell golf carts.
- 1966 – General Motors presents Electrovan, the world's first fuel cell automobile.
- 1966 – Slush hydrogen.
- 1966 – J-2 (rocket engine) liquid hydrogen rocket engine flies.
- 1967 – Akira Fujishima discovers the Honda-Fujishima effect, used for photocatalysis in the photoelectrochemical cell.
- 1967 – Hydride compressor.
- 1970 – Nickel hydrogen battery.
- 1970 – John Bockris or Lawrence W. Jones coins the term hydrogen economy.
- 1973 – The 30 km hydrogen pipeline in Isbergues.
- 1973 – Linear compressor.
- 1975 – John Bockris – Energy, The Solar-Hydrogen Alternative – ISBN 0-470-08429-4.
- 1979 – HM7B rocket engine.
- 1981 – Space Shuttle Main Engine first flight.
- 1988 – First flight of Tupolev Tu-155, a variant of the Tu-154 airliner designed to run on hydrogen.
- 1990 – The first solar-powered hydrogen production plant Solar-Wasserstoff-Bayern becomes operational.
- 1996 – Vulcain rocket engine.
- 1997 – Anastasios Melis discovers that the deprivation of sulfur will cause algae to switch from producing oxygen to producing hydrogen.
- 1998 – Type 212 submarine.
- 1999 – Hydrogen pinch.
- 2000 – Peter Toennies demonstrates superfluidity of hydrogen at 0.15 K.

=== 21st century ===
- 2001 – The first type IV hydrogen tanks for compressed hydrogen at 700 bar (10000 PSI) are demonstrated.
- 2002 – Type 214 submarine.
- 2002 – The first hydrail locomotive is demonstrated in Val-d'Or, Quebec.
- 2004 – DeepC, an autonomous underwater vehicle propelled by an electric motor powered by a hydrogen fuel cell.
- 2005 – Ionic liquid piston compressor.
- 2013 – The first commercial 2 megawatt power to gas installation in Falkenhagen comes online for 360 cubic meters of hydrogen per hour hydrogen storage into the natural gas grid.
- 2014 – The Japanese fuel cell micro combined heat and power (mCHP) ENE FARM project passes 100,000 sold systems.
- 2014 – Toyota releases its first hydrogen fuel cell car, the Mirai.
- 2017 – Hydrogen Council is formed to expedite development and commercialization of hydrogen and fuel cell technologies. EMEC produces world's first tidal-powered hydrogen in Orkney, Scotland.
- 2019 – Researchers at the KU Leuven university, Belgium, develop a solar hydrogen panel that is able to produce 250l of H_{2} per day directly from sunlight and water vapor utilizing phytocatalytic water splitting, reporting a conversion efficiency of 15% – about a 150-fold improvement of the efficiency figure ten years back (0.1%).
- 2021 – Enapter, co-founded by Vaitea Cowan, is awarded the 2021 Earthshot Prize for the ‘Fix our Climate’ category for its AEM Electrolyser technology, which turns renewable electricity into emission-free hydrogen gas. RAF gains Guinness World Record for the first successful flight powered by synthetic fuel produced from green hydrogen generated by EMEC in Orkney.
- 2022 – Researchers in Cambridge develop floating artificial leaves for light-driven hydrogen production. The lightweight, flexible devices are scalable and can float on water similar to lotus leaves.
- 2023 – Toyota's liquid hydrogen powered Corolla participates in the Super Taikyu Fuji 24 Hours Race where it beats gaseous hydrogen powered Corolla's previous record by completing 358 laps (1,634 km).
- 2024 – NREL begins research on megawatt-scale hydrogen systems and launches the roll-to-roll consortium to start high-volume manufacturing of electrolyzers and hydrogen fuel cells.

== See also ==
- Timeline of sustainable energy research 2020–present
- List of years in science (2026 in science)
