= Diaphragm compressor =

Variant of the reciprocating compressor

A diaphragm compressor is a variant of the classic reciprocating compressor with backup and piston rings and rod seal. The compression of gas occurs by means of a flexible membrane, instead of an intake element. The back and forth moving membrane is driven by a rod and a crankshaft mechanism. Only the membrane and the compressor box come in touch with pumped gas. For this reason this construction is the best suited for pumping toxic and explosive gases. The membrane has to be reliable enough to take the strain of pumped gas. It must also have adequate chemical properties and sufficient temperature resistance.

A diaphragm compressor is the same as a membrane compressor.

== Invention ==
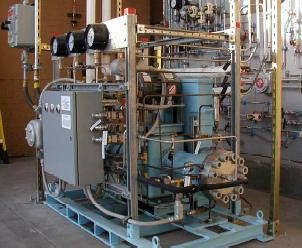
A three-stage diaphragm compressor

In the late 19th century William Burton started a workshop building pumps and air compressors at Nogent-sur-Oise, 60km north of Paris, France. Henri Corblin, generally recognised as the inventor of the metallic diaphragm compressor, was based nearby in Paris itself and in 1923 he received a US patent for his invention and design work.

== Compression of hydrogen gas ==
The photograph included in this section depicts a three-stage diaphragm compressor used to compress hydrogen gas to 6,000 psi (41 MPa) for use in a prototype hydrogen and compressed natural gas (CNG) fueling station built in downtown Phoenix, Arizona by the Arizona Public Service company (an electric utilities company). Reciprocating compressors were used to compress the natural gas. The prototype alternative fueling station was built in compliance with all of the prevailing safety, environmental and building codes in Phoenix to demonstrate that such fueling stations could be built in urban areas.

Hydrogen compression can also be achieved without the use of a compressor in high pressure electrolysis, or with an ionic liquid piston compressor.

== See also ==
- Axial compressor
