= Guided-rotor compressor =

Type of positive-displacement rotary gas compressor

The guided-rotor compressor (GRC) is a positive-displacement rotary gas compressor. The compression volume is defined by the trochoidally rotating rotor mounted on an eccentric drive shaft with a typical 80 to 85% adiabatic efficiency.

== History ==
As the guided-rotor compressor rotates around the eccentric shaft, the central rotor pumps fluid

The development of the GRC started in 1990 to minimize the use of compressor valve plates and springs by using simple inlet/discharge ports.

== Uses ==
The guided-rotor compressor is under research as a hydrogen compressor for hydrogen stations and hydrogen pipeline transport.

== See also ==
- Liquid-ring pump – Type of rotating positive-displacement pump.
- Rotary-screw compressor – Gas compressor using a rotary positive-displacement mechanism
- Rotary vane pump – Positive-displacement pump consisting of vanes mounted to a rotor that rotates inside a cavity
