= Reciprocating compressor =

Device used to pump gases at high pressure

Reciprocating compressor function

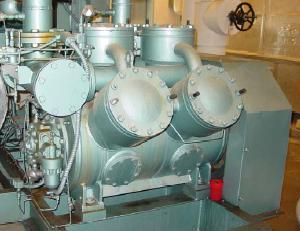
A motor-driven six-cylinder reciprocating compressor that can operate with two, four or six cylinders

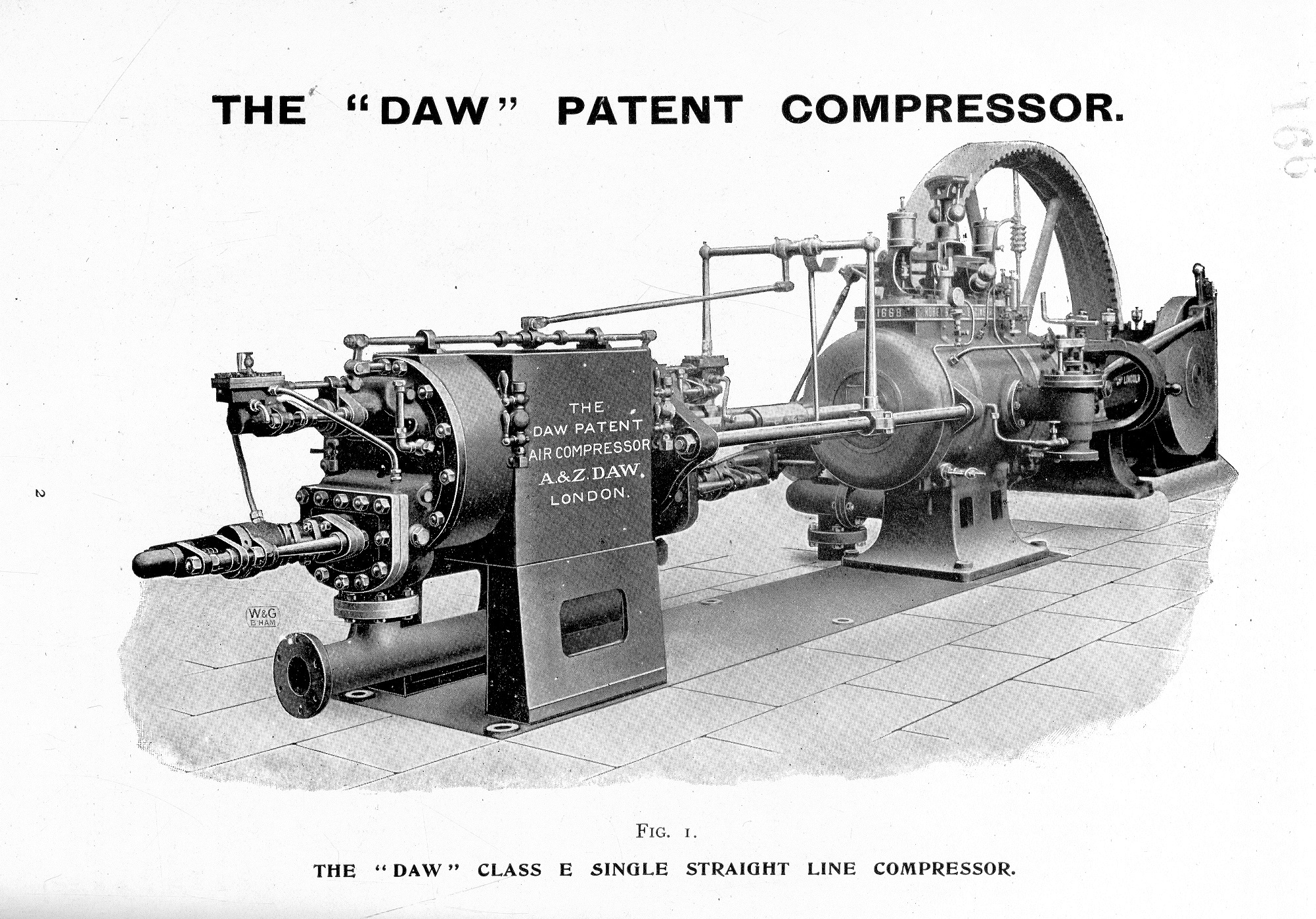
An A & Z Daw Class E Single Straight Line Compressor as available in 1902

A reciprocating compressor or piston compressor is a positive-displacement compressor that uses pistons driven by a crankshaft to deliver gases at high pressure. Pressures of up to 5,000 psig (about 34.5 MPa) are commonly produced by multistage reciprocating compressors.

The intake gas enters the suction manifold, then flows into the compression cylinder where it gets compressed by a piston driven in a reciprocating motion via a crankshaft, and is then discharged. Applications include railway and road vehicle air brake systems oil refineries, gas pipelines, oil and gas production drilling and well services, air and nitrogen injection, offshore platforms, chemical plants, natural gas processing plants, air conditioning, and refrigeration plants. One specialty application is the blowing of plastic bottles made of polyethylene terephthalate (PET).

== See also ==
- Centrifugal compressor
- Diving air compressor
- Vapor-compression refrigeration
