= Linear compressor =

Gas compressor where the piston is driven by a linear actuator

A linear compressor is a gas compressor where the piston moves along a linear track to minimize friction and reduce energy loss during conversion of motion. This technology has been successfully used in cryogenic applications which must be oil-less. The suspension spring can be flexure type or coil type. An oil-free valved linear compressor enables the design of compact heat exchangers. Linear compressors work similarly to a solenoid: by using a spring-loaded piston with an electromagnet connected to AC through a diode. The spring-loaded piston is the only moving part, and it is placed in the center of the electromagnet. During the positive cycle of the AC, the diode allows energy to pass through the electromagnet, generating a magnetic field that moves the piston backwards, compressing the spring, and generating suction. During the negative cycle of the AC, the diode blocks current flow to the electromagnet, letting the spring uncompress, moving the piston forward, and compressing the refrigerant. The compressed refrigerant is then released by a valve. Alternatively the coil can be driven by an inverter with a PWM signal.

== History ==
A number of patents for linear compressors powered by free-piston engines were issued in the 20th century, including:

- To Brown, Boveri & Cie, GB191215963, published 1913-10-08
- To Hugo Junkers, CA245708, published 1924-12-30
- To Raúl Pateras Pescara, US1615133, published 1927-01-18

The first market introduction of a linear compressor to compress refrigerant in a refrigerator was in 2001.

== Valved linear compressor ==
The single piston linear compressor uses dynamic counterbalancing, where an auxiliary movable mass is flexibly attached to a movable piston assembly and to the stationary compressor casing using auxiliary mechanical springs with zero vibration export at minimum electrical power and current consumed by the motor. It is used in cryogenics. Linear compressors are used as they have fewer mechanical losses.

Linear compressors are made by LG and used in LG and Kenmore refrigerators. Linear compressors were also announced by Embraco. Compressors of this type have less noise, and are more energy efficient than conventional refrigerator compressors. The Embraco linear compressors are also claimed to be oil-free. In the 2010s and 2020s, multiple lawsuits in the United States alleged premature failure and loss of cooling in refrigerators equipped with LG linear compressors. LG settled class-action litigation covering refrigerators manufactured between January 1, 2014 and December 31, 2017, providing affected owners an extended five-year warranty from the date of purchase, while additional lawsuits and allegations continued in the 2020s. Appliance-repair trade reporting describes mechanical failure modes in these compressors — seizure of the piston, connecting rod assembly or suspension springs — that can occur while the motor windings still measure normal resistance, so a winding-resistance test alone does not rule out a mechanically failed compressor.

== See also ==
- Booster pump – Machine to increase pressure of a fluid
- Hydrogen compressor – Device to increase pressure of hydrogen gas
- Liquid hydrogen – Liquid state of the element hydrogen
- Timeline of low-temperature technology
- Timeline of hydrogen technologies
- Scroll compressor
