= Photofermentation =

Photofermentation is the fermentative conversion of organic substrate to biohydrogen manifested by a diverse group of photosynthetic bacteria by a series of biochemical reactions involving three steps similar to anaerobic conversion. Photofermentation differs from dark fermentation because it only proceeds in the presence of light.

For example, photo-fermentation with Rhodobacter sphaeroides SH2C (or many other purple non-sulfur bacteria) can be employed to convert small molecular fatty acids into hydrogen and other products.

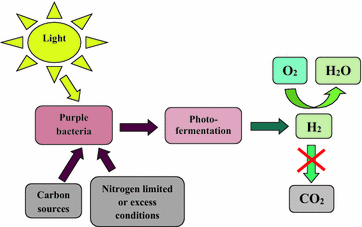
Depicts general process of photofermentation.

== Light-dependent pathways ==
=== Phototropic bacteria ===
Phototropic bacteria produce hydrogen gas via photofermentation, where the hydrogen is sourced from organic compounds.

$\ce{C6H12O6 + 6H2O ->[{hv}] 6CO2 + 12H2}$

=== Photolytic producers ===
Photolytic producers are similar to phototrophs, but source hydrogen from water molecules that are broken down as the organism interacts with light. Photolytic producers consist of algae and certain photosynthetic bacteria.

$\ce{12H2O ->[{hv}] 12H2 + 6O2}$(algae)

$\ce{CO + H2O ->[{hv}] H2 + CO2}$(photolytic bacteria)

== Sustainable energy production ==
Photofermentation via purple nonsulfur producing bacteria has been explored as a method for the production of biofuel. The natural fermentation product of these bacteria, hydrogen gas, can be harnessed as a natural gas energy source. Photofermentation via algae instead of bacteria is used for bioethanol production, among other liquid fuel alternatives.

Basic principles of a bioreactor. The photofermentation bioreactor would not include an air pathway.

=== Mechanism ===
The bacteria and their energy source are held in a bioreactor chamber that is impermeable to air and oxygen free. The proper temperature for the bacterial species is maintained in the bioreactor. The bacteria are sustained with a carbohydrate diet consisting of simple saccharide molecules. The carbohydrates are typically sourced from agricultural or forestry waste.

=== Variations ===
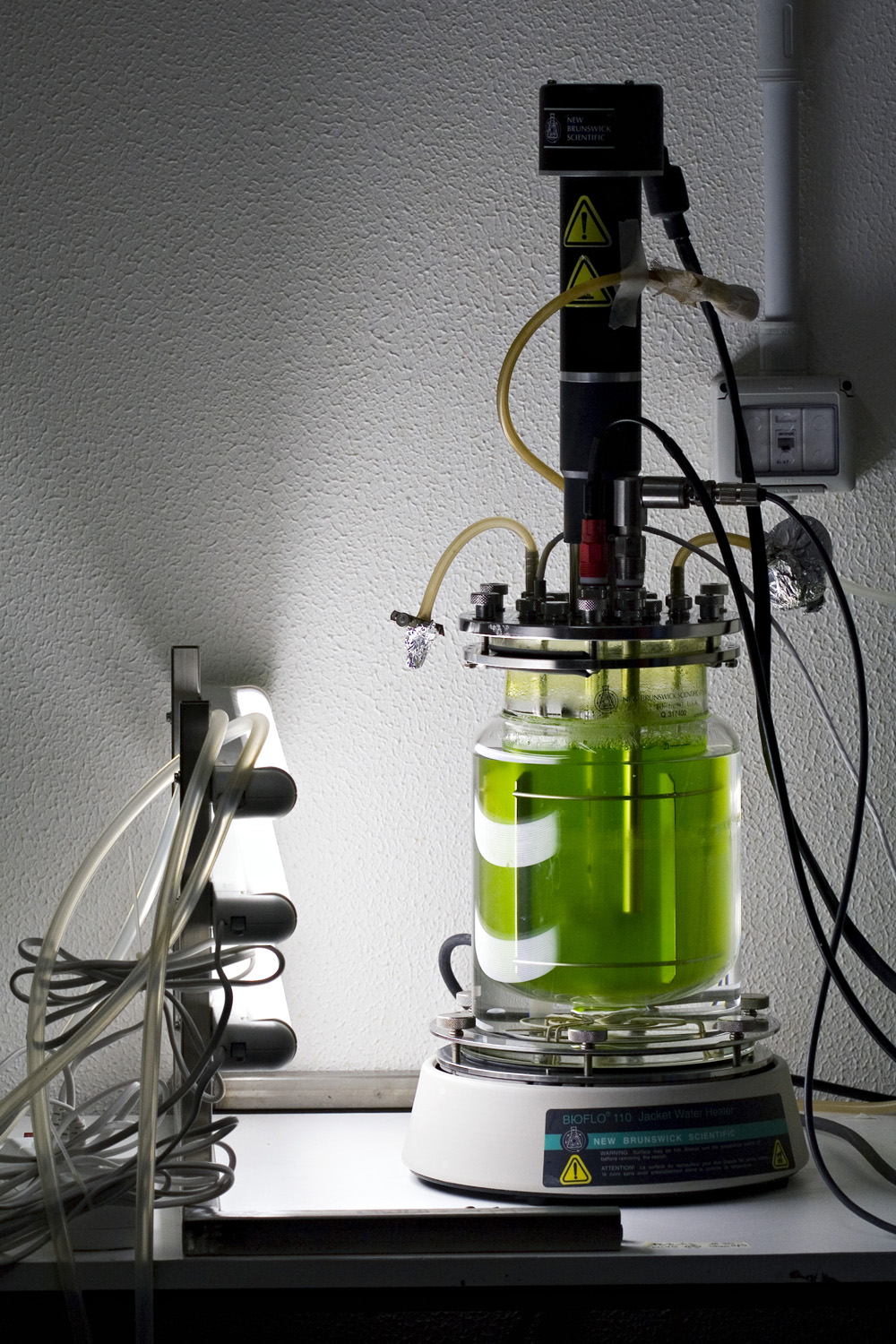
Depiction of algae (species not specified) in a bioreactor suitable for bioethanol production.

In addition to wild type forms of Rhodopseudomonas palustris, scientists have used genetically modified forms to produce hydrogen as well. Other explorations include expanding the bioreactor system to hold a combination of bacteria, algae or cyanobacteria. Ethanol production is performed by the algae Chlamydomonas reinhardtii, among other species, in cycling light and dark environments. The cycling of light and dark environments has also been explored with bacteria for hydrogen production, increasing hydrogen yield.

=== Advantages ===
The bacteria are typically fed with broken down agricultural waste or undesired crops, such as water lettuce or sugar beet molasses. The high abundance of such waste ensures the stable food source for the bacteria and productively uses human-produced waste. In comparison with dark fermentation, photofermentation produces more hydrogen per reaction and avoids the acidic end products of dark fermentation.

=== Limitations ===
The primary limitations of photofermentation as a sustainable energy source stem from the precise requirements of maintaining the bacteria in the bioreactor. Researchers have found it difficult to maintain a constant temperature for the bacteria within the bioreactor. Furthermore, the growth media for the bacteria must be rotated and refreshed without introducing air to the bioreactor system, complicating the already expensive bioreactor set up.

== See also ==
- Dark fermentation
- Fermentative hydrogen production
- Biohydrogen
- Fermentation (biochemistry)
- Hydrogen production
- Photochemical reaction
- Photohydrogen
- Phototroph
- Photobiology
- Electrohydrogenesis
- Microbial fuel cell
