= Twelve Mile Ranch =

Ranch in southern Black Hills of South Dakota

Coordinates: 43°39′17.92″N 103°44′28.71″W

Twelve Mile Ranch is a historic ranch in the southern Black Hills of South Dakota. It is located in Pleasant Valley, 12 miles (19 km) southwest of the city of Custer, which is where it gets its name.

== History ==
Twelve Mile Ranch was founded in the early 1880s by Joseph H. Heumphreus, who came to the Black Hills in 1877 on a cattle drive of Texas longhorns via the famous Texas Trail. Heumphreus spent a few years in Deadwood, South Dakota, and Tigerville, South Dakota, during the Black Hills Gold Rush. He was living in Custer County in the southern Black Hills by 1880, and settled in Pleasant Valley in 1884 where Twelve Mile Ranch is today. He would later acquire the land using "squatter's rights," which allowed inhabitants of unoccupied land to take ownership after living and working on the property for a designated period of time.

Soon after Heumphreus settled in Pleasant Valley he was visited by the owners of the Cheyenne & Black Hills Stage company, entering into an agreement to become a way station during the Black Hills Gold Rush. Heumphreus provided sleeping accommodations and meals for freighters and lone horsemen and a stable of fresh horses for stagecoaches before they continued the 300-mile (480 km) journey between Cheyenne, Wyoming, and Deadwood. Hundreds of travelers sought shelter and rest at Twelve Mile and protection from Native Americans and highwaymen throughout the 1880s until the stagecoach route was disbanded in 1887.

In the late 1880s and throughout 1890s, Twelve Mile was host to notables such as Theodore Roosevelt, the Deadwood lawman Seth Bullock, who was one of Roosevelt's famed Rough Riders, and gunfighter John H. "Johnny" Owens, an original member of Bullock's Cowboy Brigade. Family lore tells a story that the outlaw Jesse James stayed at the ranch in its earliest days.

Once the stagecoach route was disbanded the Heumphreus family began raising cattle and horses on the ranch. In the 1930s, Twelve Mile expanded into a dude ranch, hosting hundreds of people from all over the country, including Sen. Francis Case, South Dakota Gov. Tom Berry and author Archer B. Gilfillan. Dr. Barnett Cohen, a bacteriologist from Johns Hopkins University School of Medicine who performed the first ultra-microscopic surgeries, visited the ranch almost every summer in the 1930s and 1940s. The artist, lecturer and writer Walter S. Phillips lived at the ranch for much of the last 12 years of his life from 1928 to 1940. For several years in the 1930s, a group of students from Smith College spent a few weeks in the summer at the ranch studying geology. Members of the National Geographic Society and the United States Army Air Corps were guests at the ranch during operations to launch the Explorer — a manned high-altitude balloon capable of stratospheric flight—from the Stratobowl in 1934 and attempted launch of the Explorer II in 1935.

Since December 2017 the ranch has been owned by two brothers, fourth-generation descendants of Joseph Heumphreus, making Twelve Mile the oldest ranch in the Black Hills that is still in the same family as its founders.
