= Microbial fuel cell =

Bio-electrochemical system

Microbial fuel cell (MFC) is a type of bioelectrochemical fuel cell system also known as micro fuel cell that generates electric current by diverting electrons produced from the microbial oxidation of reduced compounds (also known as fuel or electron donor) on the anode to oxidized compounds such as oxygen (also known as oxidizing agent or electron acceptor) on the cathode through an external electrical circuit. MFCs are considered a type of microbial electrochemical technology (MET). MFCs produce electricity by using the electrons derived from biochemical reactions catalyzed by bacteria. MFCs can be grouped into two general categories: mediated and unmediated. The first MFCs, demonstrated in the early 20th century, used a mediator: a chemical that transfers electrons from the bacteria in the cell to the anode. Unmediated MFCs emerged in the 1970s; in this type of MFC the bacteria typically have electrochemically active redox proteins such as cytochromes on their outer membrane that can transfer electrons directly to the anode. In the 21st century MFCs have started to find commercial use in wastewater treatment.

== History ==
The idea of using microbes to produce electricity was conceived in the early twentieth century. Michael Cressé Potter initiated the subject in 1911. Potter managed to generate electricity from Saccharomyces cerevisiae, but the work received little coverage. In 1931, Barnett Cohen created microbial half fuel cells that, when connected in series, were capable of producing over 35 volts with only a current of 2 milliamps.

A study by DelDuca et al. used hydrogen produced by the fermentation of glucose by Clostridium butyricum as the reactant at the anode of a hydrogen and air fuel cell. Though the cell functioned, it was unreliable owing to the unstable nature of hydrogen production by the micro-organisms. This issue was resolved by Suzuki et al. in 1976, who produced a successful MFC design a year later.

In the late 1970s, little was understood about how microbial fuel cells functioned. The concept was studied by Robin M. Allen and later by H. Peter Bennetto. People saw the fuel cell as a possible method for the generation of electricity for developing countries. Bennetto's work, starting in the early 1980s, helped build an understanding of how fuel cells operate and he was seen by some as the topic's foremost authority.

In May 2007, the University of Queensland, Australia completed a prototype MFC as a cooperative effort with Foster's Brewing. The prototype, a 10 L design, converted brewery wastewater into carbon dioxide, clean water and electricity. The group had plans to create a pilot-scale model for an upcoming international bio-energy conference.

== Definition ==
A microbial fuel cell (MFC) is a device that converts chemical energy to electrical energy by the action of microorganisms. These electrochemical cells are constructed using either a bioanode and/or a biocathode. Most MFCs contain a membrane to separate the compartments of the anode (where oxidation takes place) and the cathode (where reduction takes place). The electrons produced during oxidation are transferred directly to an electrode or to a redox mediator species. The electron flux is moved to the cathode. The charge balance of the system is maintained by ionic movement inside the cell, usually across an ionic membrane. Most MFCs use an organic electron donor that is oxidized to produce CO_{2}, protons, and electrons. Other electron donors have been reported, such as sulfur compounds or hydrogen. The cathode reaction uses a variety of electron acceptors, most often oxygen (O_{2}). Other electron acceptors studied include metal recovery by reduction, water to hydrogen, nitrate reduction, and sulfate reduction.

== Applications ==
=== Power generation ===
MFCs are attractive for power generation applications that require only low power, but where replacing batteries may be impractical, such as wireless sensor networks. Wireless sensors powered by microbial fuel cells can then for example be used for remote monitoring (conservation).

Virtually any organic material could be used to feed the fuel cell, including coupling cells to wastewater treatment plants. Chemical process wastewater and synthetic wastewater have been used to produce bioelectricity in dual- and single-chamber mediator less MFCs (uncoated graphite electrodes).

Higher power production was observed with a biofilm-covered graphite anode. Fuel cell emissions are well under regulatory limits. MFCs convert energy more efficiently than standard internal combustion engines, which are limited by the Carnot efficiency. In theory, an MFC is capable of energy efficiency far beyond 50%. Rozendal produced hydrogen with 8 times less energy input than conventional hydrogen production technologies.

Moreover, MFCs can also work at a smaller scale. Electrodes in some cases need only be 7 μm thick by 2 cm long, such that an MFC can replace a battery. It provides a renewable form of energy and does not need to be recharged.

MFCs operate well in mild conditions, 20 °C to 40 °C and at pH of around 7 but lack the stability required for long-term medical applications such as in pacemakers.

Power stations can be based on aquatic plants such as algae. If sited adjacent to an existing power system, the MFC system can share its electricity lines.

=== Education ===
Soil-based microbial fuel cells serve as educational tools, as they encompass multiple scientific disciplines (microbiology, geochemistry, electrical engineering, etc.) and can be made using commonly available materials, such as soils and items from the refrigerator. Kits for home science projects and classrooms are available. One example of microbial fuel cells being used in the classroom is in the IBET (Integrated Biology, English, and Technology) curriculum for Thomas Jefferson High School for Science and Technology. Several educational videos and articles are also available on the International Society for Microbial Electrochemistry and Technology (ISMET Society)"".

=== Biosensor ===
The current generated from a microbial fuel cell is directly proportional to the organic-matter content of wastewater used as the fuel. MFCs can measure the solute concentration of wastewater (i.e., as a biosensor).

Wastewater is commonly assessed for its biochemical oxygen demand (BOD) values. BOD values are determined by incubating samples for 5 days with proper source of microbes, usually activated sludge collected from wastewater plants.

An MFC-type BOD sensor can provide real-time BOD values. Oxygen and nitrate are interfering preferred electron acceptors over the anode, reducing current generation from an MFC. Therefore, MFC BOD sensors underestimate BOD values in the presence of these electron acceptors. This can be avoided by inhibiting aerobic and nitrate respiration in the MFC using terminal oxidase inhibitors such as cyanide and azide. Such BOD sensors are commercially available.

The United States Navy is considering microbial fuel cells for environmental sensors. The use of microbial fuel cells to power environmental sensors could provide power for longer periods and enable the collection and retrieval of undersea data without a wired infrastructure. The energy created by these fuel cells is enough to sustain the sensors after an initial startup time. Due to undersea conditions (high salt concentrations, fluctuating temperatures and limited nutrient supply), the Navy may deploy MFCs with a mixture of salt-tolerant microorganisms that would allow for a more complete utilization of available nutrients. Shewanella oneidensis is their primary candidate, but other heat- and cold-tolerant Shewanella spp may also be included.

A first self-powered and autonomous BOD/COD biosensor has been developed and enables detection of organic contaminants in freshwater. The sensor relies only on power produced by MFCs and operates continuously without maintenance. It turns on the alarm to inform about contamination level: the increased frequency of the signal warns about a higher contamination level, while a low frequency informs about a low contamination level.

=== Biorecovery ===
In 2010, A. ter Heijne et al. constructed a device capable of producing electricity and reducing Cu^{2+} ions to copper metal.

Microbial electrolysis cells have been demonstrated to produce hydrogen.

=== Wastewater treatment ===
MFCs are used in water treatment to harvest energy utilizing anaerobic digestion. The process can also reduce pathogens. However, it requires temperatures upwards of 30 degrees C and requires an extra step in order to convert biogas to electricity. Spiral spacers may be used to increase electricity generation by creating a helical flow in the MFC. Scaling MFCs is a challenge because of the power output challenges of a larger surface area.

== Types ==
=== Mediated ===
Most microbial cells are electrochemically inactive. Electron transfer from microbial cells to the electrode is facilitated by mediators such as thionine, pyocyanin, methyl viologen, methyl blue, humic acid, and neutral red. Most available mediators are expensive and toxic.

=== Mediator-free ===
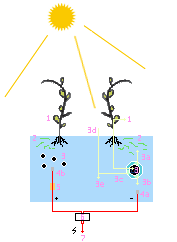
A plant microbial fuel cell (PMFC)

Mediator-free microbial fuel cells use electrochemically active bacteria such as Shewanella putrefaciens and Aeromonas hydrophila to transfer electrons directly from the bacterial respiratory enzyme to the electrode. Some bacteria are able to transfer their electron production via the pili on their external membrane. Mediator-free MFCs are less well characterized, such as the strain of bacteria used in the system, type of ion-exchange membrane and system conditions (temperature, pH, etc.)

Mediator-free microbial fuel cells can run on wastewater and derive energy directly from certain plants and O_{2}. This configuration is known as a plant microbial fuel cell. Possible plants include reed sweetgrass, cordgrass, rice, tomatoes, lupines and algae. Given that the power is obtained using living plants (in situ-energy production), this variant can provide ecological advantages.

=== Microbial electrolysis ===
One variation of the mediator-less MFC is the microbial electrolysis cell (MEC). While MFCs produce electric current by the bacterial decomposition of organic compounds in water, MECs partially reverse the process to generate hydrogen or methane by applying a voltage to bacteria. This supplements the voltage generated by the microbial decomposition of organics, leading to the electrolysis of water or methane production. A complete reversal of the MFC principle is found in microbial electrosynthesis, in which carbon dioxide is reduced by bacteria using an external electric current to form multi-carbon organic compounds.

=== Soil-based ===
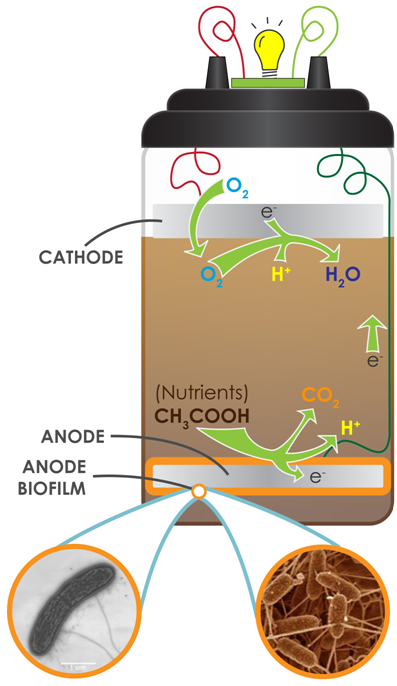
A soil-based MFC

Soil-based microbial fuel cells adhere to the basic MFC principles, whereby soil acts as the nutrient-rich anodic media, the inoculum and the proton exchange membrane (PEM). The anode is placed at a particular depth within the soil, while the cathode rests on top the soil and is exposed to air.

Soils naturally teem with diverse microbes, including electrogenic bacteria needed for MFCs, and are full of complex sugars and other nutrients that have accumulated from plant and animal material decay. Moreover, the aerobic (oxygen consuming) microbes present in the soil act as an oxygen filter, much like the expensive PEM materials used in laboratory MFC systems, which cause the redox potential of the soil to decrease with greater depth. Soil-based MFCs are becoming popular educational tools for science classrooms.

Sediment microbial fuel cells (SMFCs) have been applied for wastewater treatment. Simple SMFCs can generate energy while decontaminating wastewater. Most such SMFCs contain plants to mimic constructed wetlands. By 2015 SMFC tests had reached more than 150 L.

In 2015 researchers announced an SMFC application that extracts energy and charges a battery. Salts dissociate into positively and negatively charged ions in water and move and adhere to the respective negative and positive electrodes, charging the battery and making it possible to remove the salt effecting microbial capacitive desalination. The microbes produce more energy than is required for the desalination process. In 2020, a European research project achieved the treatment of seawater into fresh water for human consumption with an energy consumption around 0.5 kWh/m3, which represents an 85% reduction in current energy consumption respect state of the art desalination technologies. Furthermore, the biological process from which the energy is obtained simultaneously purifies residual water for its discharge in the environment or reuse in agricultural/industrial uses. This has been achieved in the desalination innovation center that Aqualia has opened in Denia, Spain early 2020.

=== Phototrophic biofilm ===
Phototrophic biofilm MFCs (ner) use a phototrophic biofilm anode containing photosynthetic microorganism such as chlorophyta and candyanophyta. They carry out photosynthesis and thus produce organic metabolites and donate electrons.

One study found that PBMFCs display a power density sufficient for practical applications.

The sub-category of phototrophic MFCs that use purely oxygenic photosynthetic material at the anode are sometimes called biological photovoltaic systems.

=== Nanoporous membrane ===
The United States Naval Research Laboratory developed nanoporous membrane microbial fuel cells that use a non-PEM to generate passive diffusion within the cell. The membrane is a nonporous polymer filter (nylon, cellulose, or polycarbonate). It offers comparable power densities to Nafion (a well-known PEM) with greater durability. Porous membranes allow passive diffusion thereby reducing the necessary power supplied to the MFC in order to keep the PEM active and increasing the total energy output.

MFCs that do not use a membrane can deploy anaerobic bacteria in aerobic environments. However, membrane-less MFCs experience cathode contamination by the indigenous bacteria and the power-supplying microbe. The novel passive diffusion of nanoporous membranes can achieve the benefits of a membrane-less MFC without worry of cathode contamination.Nanoporous membranes are also 11 times cheaper than Nafion (Nafion-117, $0.22/cm^{2} vs. polycarbonate, <$0.02/cm^{2}).

=== Ceramic membrane ===
PEM membranes can be replaced with ceramic materials. Ceramic membrane costs can be as low as $5.66/m^{2}. The macroporous structure of ceramic membranes allows for good transport of ionic species.

The materials that have been successfully employed in ceramic MFCs are earthenware, alumina, mullite, pyrophyllite, and terracotta.

== Generation process ==
When microorganisms consume a substance such as sugar in aerobic conditions, they produce carbon dioxide and water. However, when oxygen is not present, they may produce carbon dioxide, hydrons (hydrogen ions), and electrons, as described below for sucrose:

C_{12}H_{22}O_{11} + 13H_{2}O → 12CO_{2} + 48H^{+} + 48e^{−}	Eqt. 1

Microbial fuel cells use inorganic mediators to tap into the electron transport chain of cells and channel electrons produced. The mediator crosses the outer cell lipid membranes and bacterial outer membrane; then, it begins to liberate electrons from the electron transport chain that normally would be taken up by oxygen or other intermediates.

The now-reduced mediator exits the cell laden with electrons that it transfers to an electrode; this electrode becomes the anode. The release of the electrons recycles the mediator to its original oxidized state, ready to repeat the process. This can happen only under anaerobic conditions; if oxygen is present, it will collect the electrons, as it has more free energy to release.

Certain bacteria can circumvent the use of inorganic mediators by making use of special electron transport pathways known collectively as extracellular electron transfer (EET). EET pathways allow the microbe to directly reduce compounds outside of the cell, and can be used to enable direct electrochemical communication with the anode.

In MFC operation, the anode is the terminal electron acceptor recognized by bacteria in the anodic chamber. Therefore, the microbial activity is strongly dependent on the anode's redox potential. A Michaelis–Menten curve was obtained between the anodic potential and the power output of an acetate-driven MFC. A critical anodic potential seems to provide maximum power output.

Potential mediators include natural red, methylene blue, thionine, and resorufin.

Organisms capable of producing an electric current are termed exoelectrogens. In order to turn this current into usable electricity, exoelectrogens have to be accommodated in a fuel cell.

The mediator and a micro-organism such as yeast, are mixed together in a solution to which is added a substrate such as glucose. This mixture is placed in a sealed chamber to prevent oxygen from entering, thus forcing the micro-organism to undertake anaerobic respiration. An electrode is placed in the solution to act as the anode.

In the second chamber of the MFC is another solution and the positively charged cathode. It is the equivalent of the oxygen sink at the end of the electron transport chain, external to the biological cell. The solution is an oxidizing agent that picks up the electrons at the cathode. As with the electron chain in the yeast cell, this could be a variety of molecules such as oxygen, although a more convenient option is a solid oxidizing agent, which requires less volume.

Connecting the two electrodes is a wire (or other electrically conductive path). Completing the circuit and connecting the two chambers is a salt bridge or ion-exchange membrane. This last feature allows the protons produced, as described in Eqt. 1, to pass from the anode chamber to the cathode chamber.

The reduced mediator carries electrons from the cell to the electrode. Here the mediator is oxidized as it deposits the electrons. These then flow across the wire to the second electrode, which acts as an electron sink. From here they pass to an oxidizing material. Also the hydrogen ions/protons are moved from the anode to the cathode via a proton exchange membrane such as Nafion. They will move across to the lower concentration gradient and be combined with the oxygen but to do this they need an electron. This generates current and the hydrogen is used sustaining the concentration gradient.

Algal biomass has been observed to give high energy when used as the substrate in microbial fuel cell.

== See also ==
- Bacterial nanowires
- Biobattery
- Cable bacteria
- Dark fermentation
- Electrohydrogenesis
- Electromethanogenesis
- Fermentative hydrogen production
- Glossary of fuel cell terms
- Hydrogen hypothesis
- Hydrogen technologies
- Photofermentation
