= Fermentative hydrogen production =

Fermentative hydrogen production is the fermentative conversion of organic substrates to H_{2}. Hydrogen produced in this manner is often called biohydrogen. The conversion is affected by bacteria and protozoa, which employ enzymes. Fermentative hydrogen production is one of several anaerobic conversions.

== Dark vs photofermentation ==
Dark fermentation reactions do not require light energy. These are capable of constantly producing hydrogen from organic compounds throughout the day and night. Typically these reactions are coupled to the formation of carbon dioxide or formate. Important reactions that result in hydrogen production start with glucose, which is converted to acetic acid:

C_{6}H_{12}O_{6} + 2 H_{2}O → 2 CH_{3}CO_{2}H + 2 CO_{2} + 4 H_{2}

A related reaction gives formate instead of carbon dioxide:

C_{6}H_{12}O_{6} + 2 H_{2}O → 2 CH_{3}CO_{2}H + 2 HCO_{2}H + 2 H_{2}

These reactions are exergonic by 216 and 209 kcal/mol, respectively.

Using synthetic biology, bacteria can be genetically altered to enhance this reaction.

Photofermentation differs from dark fermentation, because it only proceeds in the presence of light. Electrohydrogenesis is used in microbial fuel cell.

== Bacteria strains ==
For example, photo-fermentation with Rhodobacter sphaeroides SH2C can be employed to convert small molecular fatty acids into hydrogen.

Enterobacter aerogenes is an outstanding hydrogen producer. It is an anaerobic facultative and mesophilic bacterium that is able to consume different sugars and in contrast to cultivation of strict anaerobes, no special operation is required to remove all oxygen from the fermenter. E. aerogenes has a short doubling time and high hydrogen productivity and evolution rate. Furthermore, hydrogen production by this bacterium is not inhibited at high hydrogen partial pressures; however, its yield is lower compared to strict anaerobes like Clostridia. A theoretical maximum of 4 mol H_{2}/mol glucose can be produced by strict anaerobic bacteria. Facultative anaerobic bacteria such as E. aerogenes have a theoretical maximum yield of 2 mol H_{2}/mol glucose.

== See also ==
- Biohydrogen
- Fermentation (biochemistry)
- Hydrogen production
- Synthetic biology
- Single cell protein
