= Anastasios Melis =

Greek-American biologist

Anastasios Melis is a Greek-American biologist at the University of California, Berkeley who elucidated the possibility of creating hydrogen from algae. He is currently The Grace Kase and Harry Y. Tsujimoto Distinguished Professor of Plant & Microbial Biology in the institution, elected Fellow of the American Association for the Advancement of Science, and Editor-in-Chief of the Planta journal.

Hydrogen power is considered one of the key ways of producing electricity without continuing to use up fossil fuels. The added bonus of using algae in this way is that they could consume carbon dioxide in the atmosphere.

In 1998 Professor Anastasios Melis discovered, after following Hans Gaffron's work, that the deprivation of sulfur will cause Chlamydomonas reinhardtii algae to switch from producing oxygen to producing hydrogen. The enzyme, hydrogenase, he found was responsible for the reaction, which is normally a temporary emergency survival mechanism used in an oxygen-deprived environment. The enzyme stops functioning when oxygen is produced, however the deprivation of sulphur ensures continuous hydrogen production.

Scientists since the 1940s have been trying to get the algae to produce hydrogen in significant quantities; he told media his breakthrough was like "striking oil". He currently leads an international effort to improve the efficiency of photosynthesis by up to 300% for increased photosynthetic productivity and hydrogen production. He believes that one way for cost-competitiveness is to genetically modify the organisms to increase output.

In 2001 he co-founded a company, Melis Energy, in order to exploit his discovery, hoping to get it on the market by 2005. In the autumn of 2001, under his direction, the company built a bio-reactor containing 700 litres of water and algae that produced up to 1 litre of hydrogen per hour. A siphoning system extracted the hydrogen, which is stored in its gaseous state. The company attempted to refine the process and improve its reliability, while also searching for investors so that it can increase production volume. It has since been dissolved.

Beyond hydrogen, Dr. Melis pioneered the concept and currently leads the field of “Photosynthetic Bioproducts”. The latter entails a carbon-negative process, whereby natural chemicals, plant essential oils, and biopharmaceutical proteins emanate from photosynthesis, with a single microorganism acting both as photocatalyst and processor, consuming carbon dioxide, and synthesizing and releasing ready to use commodity and specialty products. These products are generated from sunlight, carbon dioxide and water.

Melis is recognized for his multiple ground-breaking contributions in the fields of bioenergy, photosynthetic productivity, bio-products generation, plus the design and application of fusion constructs for high-yield protein synthesis, and pioneering work installing entire exogenous metabolic pathways in microalgae and cyanobacteria.

→ CHRONICLE OF RESEARCH in the MELIS LAB

== Publications ==
Melis has authored more than 300 peer-reviewed Original Research Articles, Reviews, and Book Chapters.

== Invited seminars and lectures ==
Owing to his research contributions, Melis has been invited as a speaker and has delivered more than 180 international and national invited lectures and seminars at academic, conference, government, and industry settings in (alphabetically) Brazil, Canada, Europe (multiple countries), India, Israel, Japan, Korea, Turkey, and the US (multiple states).

== Patents ==
Anastasios Melis has issued overall ten patents, with Melis as the Principal Inventor, and former and current postdocs as co-inventors. Three of these patents were issued for his work on microbial hydrogen production: use of hydrogenase-containing photosynthetic microalgae is covered by US 6,989,252 (2006); modulation of sulfate permease for hydrogen production is covered by US 7,176,005 (2007), and improved photosynthesis efficiency in plants and algae is covered by US 7,745,696 (2010). Other patents cover the biotechnology of terpene hydrocarbons and high-capacity plant essential oils production, plus methods for the scale-up cultivation of photosynthetic microorganisms. Below is a listing of current (2019) Melis patents:

1. Hydrogen production using hydrogenase-containing oxygenic photosynthetic organisms. United States Patent 6,989,252 B2 (issued 24-Jan-2006)

2. Modulation of sulfate permease for photosynthetic hydrogen production. United States Patent 7,176,005 (issued 13-Feb-2007).

3. Suppression of Tla1 gene expression for improved solar conversion efficiency and photosynthetic productivity in plants and algae. United States Patent 7,745,696 (issued 29-June-2010)

4. Short chain volatile hydrocarbon production using genetically engineered microalgae, cyanobacteria or bacteria. United States Patent 7,947,478 (issued 24-May-2011)

5. Short chain volatile hydrocarbon production using genetically engineered microalgae, cyanobacteria or bacteria. United States Patent 8,133,708 (cyanobacteria; issued 13-Mar-2012)

6. Isoprene hydrocarbon production using genetically engineered cyanobacteria. United States Patent 8,802,407 (issued 12-August-2014)

7. Continuous diffusion-based method of cultivating photosynthetic microorganisms in a sealed photobioreactor to obtain volatile hydrocarbons. United States Patent 8,993,290 (issued 31-March-2015).

8. Diffusion-based method for obtaining volatile hydrocarbons produced by photosynthetic microorganisms in two-phase bioreactors. Australian Patent 2012245238 (issued 10 March 2016).

9. Production of beta-phellandrene using genetically engineered cyanobacteria. United States Patent 9,951,354 (issued 24-April-2018).

10. Production of β-phellandrene using genetically engineered cyanobacteria. Australian Patent 2013217130 (issued January 24, 2019).

== Honours and awards ==
- Election to the rank of Fellow, American Association for the Advancement of Science - 2011
- Research Achievement Award - US Department of Energy, Hydrogen Program - 2004
- University Research Award - DaimlerChrysler Corporation - 2003
- Distinguished Teaching Award - College of Natural Resources - 1994

== See also ==
- Timeline of hydrogen technologies
