= Solar hydrogen panel =

Device for artificial photosynthesis

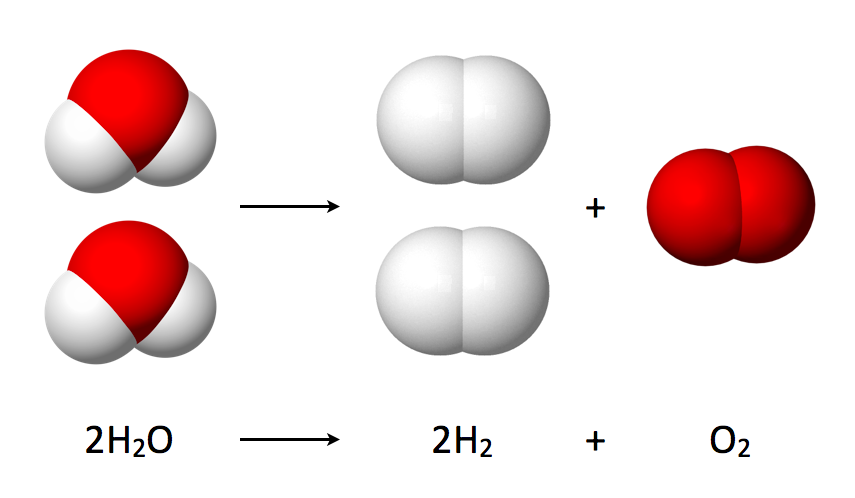
Pictured molecular formula of conversion of water to hydrogen and oxygen.

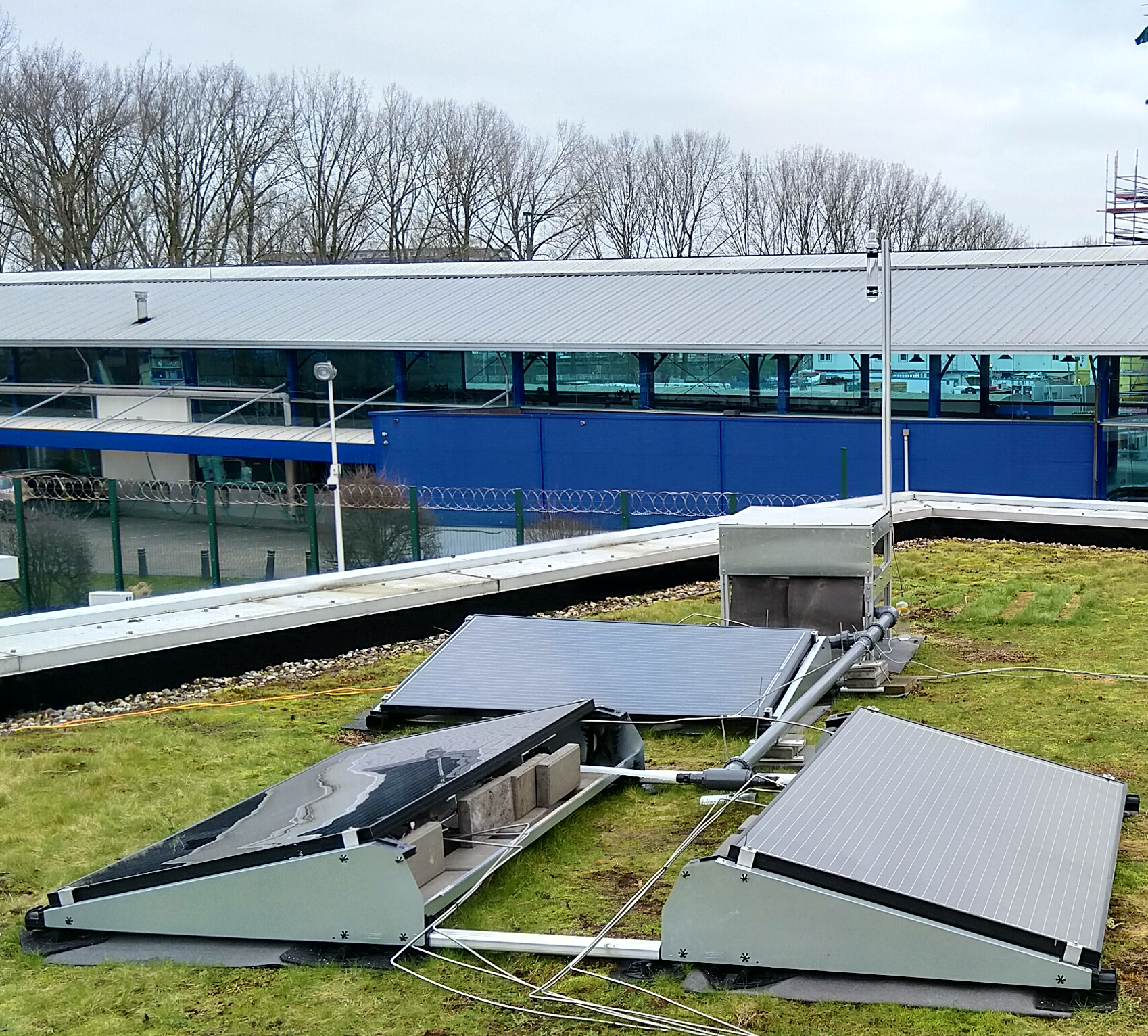
KU Leuven's Solhyd Project's solar hydrogen panels producing hydrogen in Anderlecht, Brussels in February 2021.

A solar hydrogen panel is a device for artificial photosynthesis that produces photohydrogen from sunlight and water. The panel uses electrochemical water splitting, where energy captured from solar panels powers water electrolysis, producing hydrogen and oxygen. The oxygen is discarded into the atmosphere while the hydrogen is collected and stored. Solar hydrogen panels offer a method of capturing solar energy by producing green hydrogen that can be used in industrial and transportation applications.

== Theory ==
Solar hydrogen panels operate via photovoltaic−electrochemical (PV-EC) water splitting with two components: the photovoltaic cell and the electrochemical cell (or electrolyzer). The photovoltaic cell uses solar energy to generate electricity, which it sends to an electrochemical cell. This electrochemical cell uses electrolysis to split the water electrolyte, creating hydrogen (H_{2}) at the cathode and oxygen (O_{2}) at the anode.

With the development of photovoltaic cells and electrolysis devices, the efficiency of solar hydrogen panels has been optimized to over 10%. In the photovoltaic component, the Shockley-Queisser limit restricts the efficiency of the solar cells. The efficiency of the electrolytic component depends on the catalyst chosen, with efficiencies ranging from 59 to 70%.

=== Alternative ===
Another method of solar hydrogen generation is the photoelectrochemical cell (PEC), where solar energy is captured by a semiconductor immersed in a water electrolyte. The photoelectrochemical cell is favored for its lower complexity and cost; however, it has lower efficiencies than PV-EC and cannot be contained within a panel.

== History ==
In 1970, South African electrochemist John Bockris claimed that hydrogen as a fuel source could be supplied by a chemical reaction between water and solar energy. In his 1975 book, Energy, the Solar Hydrogen Alternative, Bockris formally explained the process by which hydrogen could theoretically be extracted from solar energy. In this book, Bockris included his suggestions on using hydrogen as a medium of energy and the potential of harnessing the sun to synthesize hydrogen.

The world's first solar-powered hydrogen production plant became operational in 1990 in Neunburg vorm Wald, a town in southern Germany.

In 2019, chemists and physicists at The University of Tokyo and Tokyo Metropolitan University made improvements in the material construction and efficiency of water-splitting solar panels, showing one square meter of sunlight-exposed area with a solar-to-hydrogen efficiency of 0.4%; the research claims to be viable for scalable and cheap renewable solar hydrogen production.

Also in 2019, scientists at KU Leuven’s Center for Surface Chemistry and Catalysis in Leuven, Belgium created a solar hydrogen panel which produced hydrogen with a 15% solar-to-hydrogen efficiency, a leap from their maximum efficiency of 0.1% a decade earlier. This 15% efficiency is also the current world record for solar hydrogen panels.

The University of Michigan reported developing a panel with a water-to-hydrogen efficiency of 9% in 2023.

=== Commercialization ===
While solar hydrogen panels are currently not sophisticated enough to be sold to the general public, there are multiple companies leading the market in solar hydrogen panel production. SunHydrogen is a public company that has been working on the development of efficient solar hydrogen panels since 2009. On 19 February 2021, exactly 2 years after the reveal of their world-record panel, KU Leuven launched the Solhyd Project, an effort to make their panel commercially available.

== Future applications ==
Of the current 50 million tons of hydrogen produced annually, over 25% is directly used to produce nitrogen-based fertilizers, such as ammonia, nitrate, and urea, via the Haber-Bosch process. For ammonia, over 80% of the 175 million tons produced in 2020 were used as fertilizers and feedstocks for agricultural growth. Because the production of nitrogen-based fertilizers will continue to grow to meet population growth needs, further developments in solar hydrogen panel technology can aid the increased hydrogen needs of ammonia production.

Solar hydrogen panel technology can be beneficial for the space industry. Liquid hydrogen is utilized as rocket engine fuel, such as the BE-3PM engine on Blue Origin’s New Shepard suborbital launch vehicle. For orbital launch vehicles, the large mass of fuel and oxidizer required for launch necessitates in-space fuel production for return missions. Usage of solar hydrogen panels may offer a lightweight option to produce fuel for both hydrogen and methane-powered rocket engines.

Solar hydrogen panel technologies can be arranged in a distributed approach, where the site of hydrogen production is independent of the energy production. Existing electrical grids can be used to drive the electricity transport from solar hydrogen panels to hydrogen production plants, avoiding the need for hydrogen transport. By producing and storing hydrogen during periods of high solar insolation when the cost of electricity is low, the system could be incredibly cost and energy-efficient. The hydrogen could be stored for usage during periods of low solar insolation when electricity costs are higher. However, this method would require powered electronics for electricity transport, such as DC–DC converters and AC–DC inverters, that further reduce the system's efficiency. Further advancements would be needed to reduce the cost of grid electrolysis technologies and increase the efficiency of electricity transport to make the system viable on a larger scale.

== Challenges ==
Challenges hindering the development and large-scale adoption of this technology mostly relate to high monetary costs for panel production. Specifically, the manufacturing of photovoltaic cells remains expensive, keeping the cost of solar-based H_{2} production higher than H_{2} production from fossil fuels.

Environmental impacts of the process of creating these cells include the production of large amounts of CO_{2} and SO_{2}, contributing to global warming and ocean acidification. These impacts may offset the realized environmental benefits of the technology.

Additional obstacles relate to the lack of infrastructure for hydrogen storage and transportation. As hydrogen possesses a low volumetric energy density and high flammability, a network of specialized containers and pipelines is required to enable safe, widespread hydrogen production and use.

Another notable challenge revolves around the technology’s dependence on sunlight for operation. As solar energy can only be produced during the day, the system undergoes daily startup and shutdown sequences, which hinders the durability and efficiency of the conversion process over time. Scientists have not found an electrolyzer material that possesses sufficient durability to perturbations such as frequent on/off cycles.

== See also ==
- Hydrogen infrastructure
- Timeline of hydrogen technologies
- Liquid hydrogen
- Compressed hydrogen
- Hydrogen vehicle
  - Fuel cell vehicle
  - Hydrogen internal combustion engine vehicle
  - Hydrogen-powered aircraft
- Biohydrogen
