= Dark fermentation =

Conversion of organic substrate to biohydrogen

Dark fermentation is the fermentative conversion of organic substrate to biohydrogen. It is a complex process manifested by diverse groups of bacteria, involving a series of biochemical reactions using three steps similar to anaerobic conversion. Dark fermentation differs from photofermentation in that it proceeds without the presence of light.

== Overview ==
Fermentative/hydrolytic microorganisms hydrolyze complex organic polymers to monomers which are further converted to a mixture of lower-molecular-weight organic acids and alcohols by obligatory producing acidogenic bacteria.

Utilization of wastewater as a potential substrate for biohydrogen production has been drawing considerable interest in recent years especially in the dark fermentation process. Industrial wastewater as a fermentative substrate for H_{2} production addresses most of the criteria required for substrate selection viz., availability, cost and biodegradability. Chemical wastewater (Venkata Mohan, et al., 2007a,b), cattle wastewater (Tang, et al., 2008), dairy process wastewater (Venkata Mohan, et al. 2007c, Rai et al. 2012), starch hydrolysate wastewater (Chen, et al., 2008) and designed synthetic wastewater (Venkata Mohan, et al., 2007a, 2008b) have been reported to produce biohydrogen apart from wastewater treatment from dark fermentation processes using selectively enriched mixed cultures under acidophilic conditions. Various wastewaters viz., paper mill wastewater (Idania, et al., 2005), starch effluent (Zhang, et al., 2003), food processing wastewater (Shin et al., 2004, van Ginkel, et al., 2005), domestic wastewater (Shin, et al., 2004, 2008e), rice winery wastewater (Yu et al., 2002), distillery and molasses based wastewater (Ren, et al., 2007, Venkata Mohan, et al., 2008a), wheat straw wastes (Fan, et al., 2006) and palm oil mill wastewater (Vijayaraghavan and Ahmed, 2006) have been studied as fermentable substrates for H_{2} production along with wastewater treatment. Using wastewater as a fermentable substrate facilitates both wastewater treatment apart from H_{2} production. The efficiency of the dark fermentative H_{2} production process was found to depend on pre-treatment of the mixed consortia used as a biocatalyst, operating pH, and organic loading rate apart from wastewater characteristics (Venkata Mohan, et al., 2007d, 2008c, d, Vijaya Bhaskar, et al., 2008d).

In spite of its advantages, the main challenge observed with fermentative H_{2} production processes is the relatively low energy conversion efficiency from the organic source. Typical H_{2} yields range from 1 to 2 mol of H_{2}/mol of glucose, which results in 80-90% of the initial COD remaining in the wastewater in the form of various volatile organic acids (VFAs) and solvents, such as acetic acid, propionic acid, butyric acid, and ethanol. Even under optimal conditions about 60-70% of the original organic matter remains in solution. Bioaugmentation with selectively enriched acidogenic consortia to enhance H_{2} production was also reported (Venkata Mohan, et al., 2007b). Generation and accumulation of soluble acid metabolites causes a sharp drop in the system pH and inhibits the H_{2} production process. Usage of unutilized carbon sources present in acidogenic process for additional biogas production sustains the practical applicability of the process. One way to utilize/recover the remaining organic matter in a usable form is to produce additional H_{2} by terminal integration of photo-fermentative processes of H_{2} production (Venkata Mohan, et al. 2008e, Rai et al. 2012) and methane by integrating acidogenic processes to terminal methanogenic processes.

== See also ==
- Biogas
- Biohydrogen
- Biological hydrogen production (algae)
- Biomass
- Electrohydrogenesis
- Fermentation (biochemistry)
- Microbial fuel cell
