= Walter Shelley Phillips =

American naturalist, author and artist (1867–1940)

Walter S. Phillips
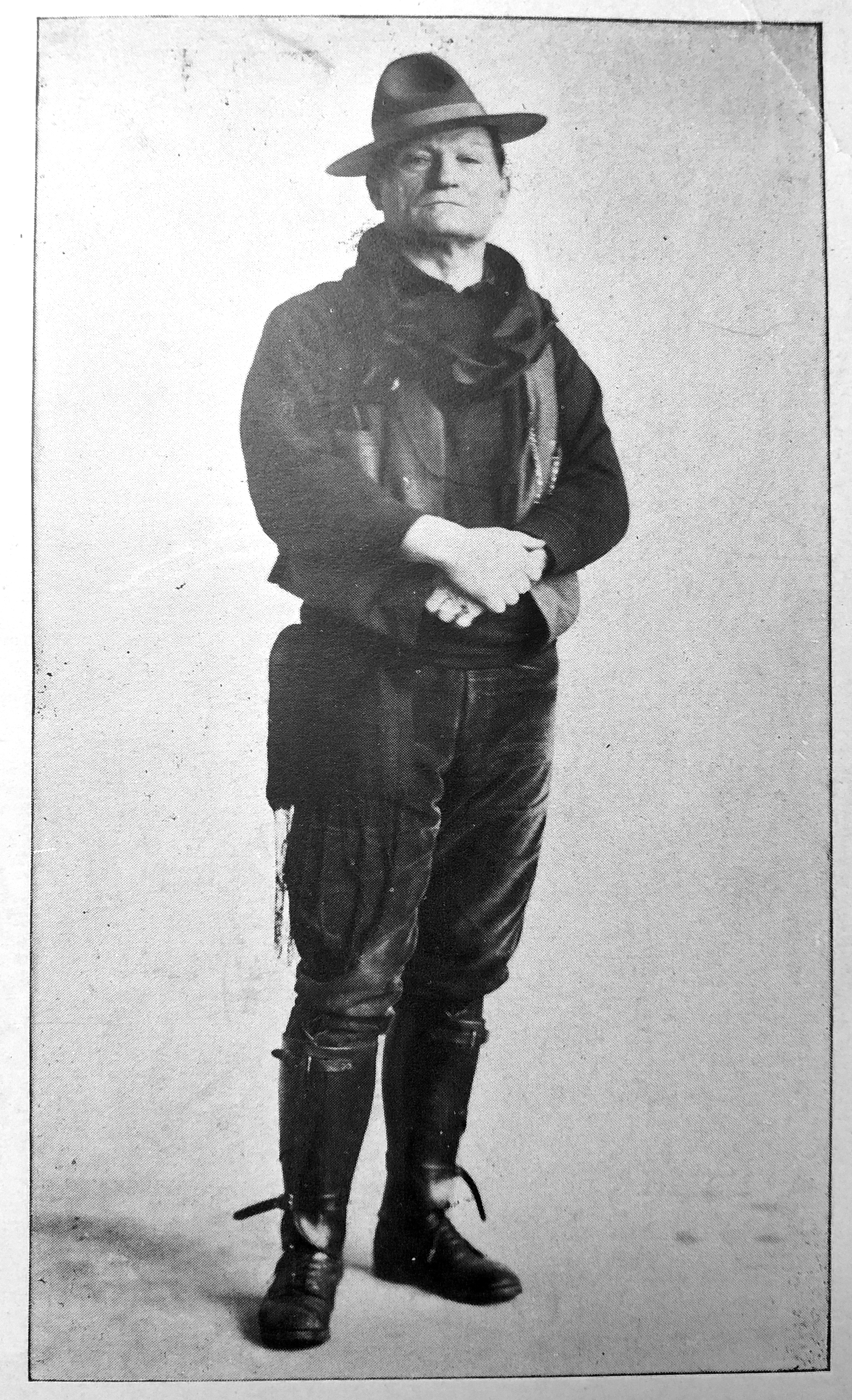
- Walter Phillips, a.k.a. "El Comancho," circa 1935.
- Born: March 3, 1867; Fairbury, Illinois
- Died: September 1, 1940 (aged 73); Seattle, Washington
- Education: Self-taught
- Known for: Writing, painting, drawing, sculpture, geology, lecture

Walter Shelley Phillips (March 3, 1867 – September 1, 1940), known as El Comancho, was a self-educated and self-trained naturalist, artist, geologist, newspaper reporter, freelance writer and author of numerous books.

== Biography ==
Phillips was born on March 3, 1867, in Fairbury, Illinois, to parents Oregon Harry and Eliza Jennie (McDowell) Phillips. The Phillips family traveled between Illinois and Pennsylvania until March 1869, when they moved by covered wagon to Beatrice, Nebraska. It was there that Phillips first became familiar with many Native American tribes, including the Otoes, Pawnees, Omahas, Sioux, Kiowa, Kansas and others. As a child, he spent much of his time with the Otoes and often lived for weeks at a time with the tribe's chief and the chief's family in their lodge and accompanied them on buffalo hunts. Phillips was given the name "Comanche" by Chief High Horse of the Sioux Tribe, but later changed it to "El Comancho" as a nom de plume for his writing and art.

Phillips did not like school but loved the outdoors, and often left his home to roam the country while school was in session. He traveled from anywhere between one week and one year at a time, and frequently made friends with different Native American tribes as he ventured as far as Seattle and southern California. All of the tribes he encountered welcomed him and many referred to him as some variation of “Lone Man.”

Early in life Phillips was a hunter for workers building the Burlington railroad across Nebraska, Wyoming and Montana. Over the course of his career, he wrote professionally and illustrated for many newspapers and magazines, including Forest & Stream, Beatrice Express, Lincoln Call, the Seattle Telegraph, the Seattle Post-Intelligencer and Chicago's Northwestern Lumberman. One of his newspaper columns, “Teepee Tales,“ was syndicated in newspapers all over the country. In 1904, he began the Pacific Sportsman magazine, which later became Outdoor Life. Phillips also wrote books, and illustrated his own and others’ books from the 1890s to the 1920s, including juvenile works, Indian legends and more. He was also a talented artist and sketched, painted and made bas-relief carvings. He shared much of what he had learned and accomplished with the general public as he lectured all over the country.

Phillips figured that over his lifetime he made 198 round-trip tours of the country from coast to coast, and that there was no 100-square mile area in the country that he had not seen. He spent much of the last 12 years of his life at the Twelve Mile Ranch near Custer, South Dakota. Phillips returned to Seattle in July 1940 to the home of his daughter, where he died just over a month later on September 1, 1940, of a brain hemorrhage.

== Bibliography ==
• Totem tales: Indian Stories Indian Told, Gathered in the Pacific Northwest. 1896.

• Indian Fairy Tales: Folklore - Legends - Myths; Totem Tales as told by the Indians. 1902.

• The Chinook Book; A Descriptive Analysis of the Chinook Jargon in Plain Words, Giving Instructions for Pronunciation, Construction, Expression and Proper Speaking of Chinook with all the Various Shaded Meanings of the Words. Seattle, R.L. Davis Printing Co., 1913.

• Indian Tales for Little Folks. New York, The Platt & Munk Co., 1914.

• The Master Power. Self published, 1922.

• Totem Fortune Tellers: The Mystic Wisdom of the Old-Time Clan of Indian Medicine. 1923.

• Teepee Tales. The Reilly & Lee Co., 1927.

• The Old-Timer's Tale. Chicago, The Canterbury Press, 1929.
