= Kværner process =

The Kværner process or the Kværner carbon black and hydrogen process (CB&H) is a method of producing carbon black and hydrogen gas from hydrocarbons such as methane, natural gas and biogas with no greenhouse gas pollution. The process was developed in the 1980s by the Norwegian engineering firm Kværner, and was first commercially exploited in 1999. Further refinement enabled the methane pyrolysis process for implementation at high-volume and low-cost.

== Description ==
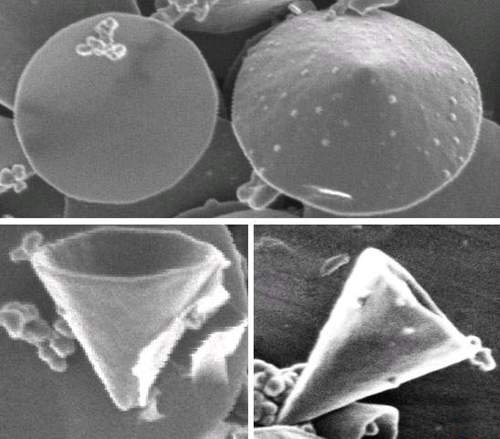
Scanning electron microscope (SEM) image of carbon nanocones (maximum diameter ~1 μm) produced by pyrolysis of crude oil in the Kvaerner process.

The endothermic reaction separates (i.e. decomposes) hydrocarbons into carbon and hydrogen in a plasma burner at around 1600 °C. The resulting components, carbon particles and hydrogen, are present as a mixture in form of an aerosol.

$$\ce{C_\mathit{n}H_\mathit{m} -> {\mathit{n}C} + \frac{\mathit{m}}{2} H2}$$

In comparison to other reformation methods such as steam reforming and partial oxidation that have carbon dioxide as a by-product, there is no by-product in the Kværner process. The natural gas is efficiently and completely transformed into pure carbon and hydrogen and does not release carbon dioxide into the atmosphere. After separating the mixture, the carbon particles can be used for instance as activated carbon, graphite or industrial soot, special kinds of carbon such as carbon discs and carbon cones (see SEM image). The carbon is obtained as black powdery solid matter and forms a technical product which may be used e.g. as filler in the rubber industry, as pigment soot for inks and paints or as raw material for electrical components. The hydrogen may be discharged for the chemical industry or may be used for generating electricity.

Of the available energy of the feed, approximately 48% is contained in the hydrogen, 40% is contained in activated carbon and 10% in superheated steam.

== Plasma variation ==
A variation of this process using plasma arc waste disposal was presented in 2009. Methane and natural gas is converted to hydrogen, heat and carbon using a plasma converter.

== See also ==
- Hydrogen production
- Methane pyrolysis
- Renewable energy
- Electric arc
