= Biological photovoltaics =

Biological photovoltaics, also called biophotovoltaics or BPV, is an energy-generating technology which uses oxygenic photoautotrophic organisms, or fractions thereof, to harvest light energy and produce electrical power. Biological photovoltaic devices are a type of biological electrochemical system, or microbial fuel cell, and are sometimes also called photo-microbial fuel cells or “living solar cells”. In a biological photovoltaic system, electrons generated by photolysis of water are transferred to an anode. A relatively high-potential reaction takes place at the cathode, and the resulting potential difference drives current through an external circuit to do useful work. It is hoped that using a living organism (which is capable of self-assembly and self-repair) as the light harvesting material, will make biological photovoltaics a cost-effective alternative to synthetic light-energy-transduction technologies such as silicon-based photovoltaics.

== Principle of operation ==
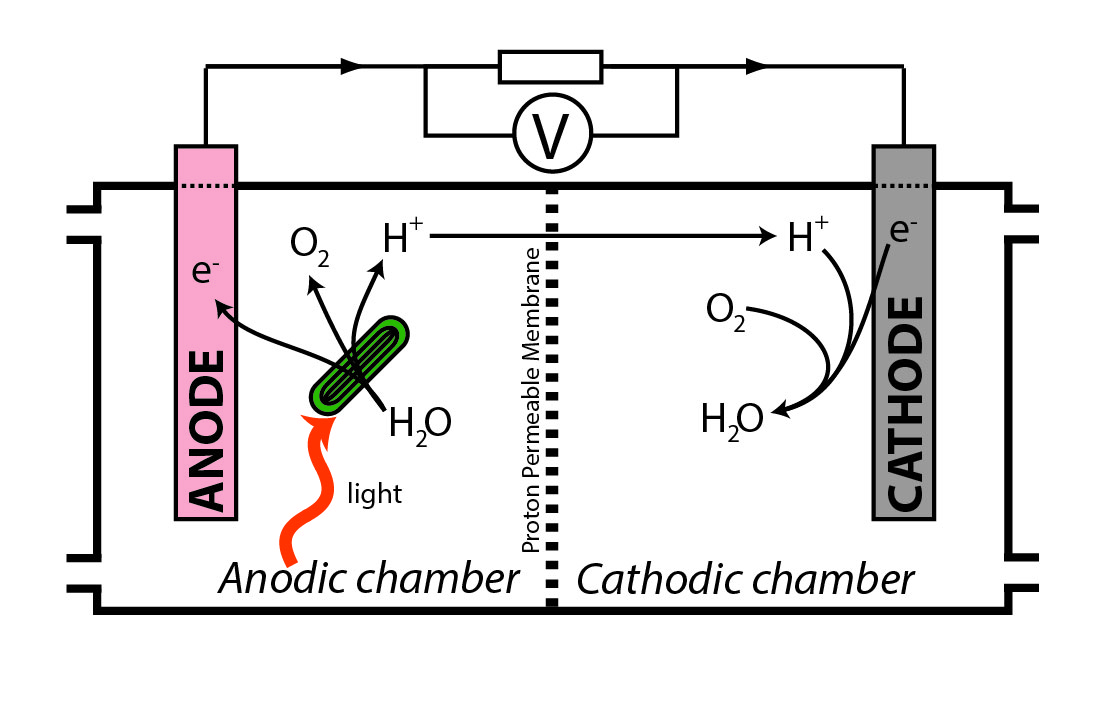
An illustration of how a biological photovoltaic system operates.

Like other fuel cells, biological photovoltaic systems are divided into anodic and cathodic half-cells.

Oxygenic photosynthetic biological material, such as purified photosystems or whole algal or cyanobacterial cells, are employed in the anodic half-cell. These organisms are able to use light energy to drive the oxidation of water, and a fraction of the electrons produced by this reaction are transferred to the extracellular environment, where they can be used to reduce an anode. No heterotrophic organisms are included in the anodic chamber - electrode reduction is performed directly by the photosynthetic material.

The higher electrode potential of the cathodic reaction relative to the reduction of the anode drives current through an external circuit. In the illustration, oxygen is being reduced to water at the cathode, though other electron acceptors can be used. If water is regenerated there is a closed loop in terms of electron flow (similar to a conventional photovoltaic system), i.e. light energy is the only net input required for production of electrical power. Alternatively, electrons can be used at the cathode for electrosynthetic reactions that produce useful compounds, such as the reduction of protons to hydrogen gas.

=== Distinctive properties ===
Similar to microbial fuel cells, biological photovoltaic systems which employ whole organisms have the advantage over non-biological fuel cells and photovoltaic systems of being able to self-assemble and self-repair (i.e. the photosynthetic organism is able to reproduce itself). The ability of the organism to store energy allows for power generation from biological photovoltaic systems in the dark, circumventing the grid supply and demand problems sometimes faced by conventional photovoltaics. Additionally, the use of photosynthetic organisms that fix carbon dioxide means the 'assembly' of the light harvesting material in a biological photovoltaic system could have a negative carbon footprint.

Compared to microbial fuel cells, which use heterotrophic microorganisms, biological photovoltaic systems need no input of organic compounds to supply reducing equivalents to the system. This improves the efficiency of light-to-electricity conversion by minimising the number of reactions separating the capture of light energy and reduction of the anode. A disadvantage of using oxygenic photosynthetic material in bioelectrochemical systems is that the production of oxygen in the anodic chamber has a detrimental effect on the cell voltage.

== Types of biological photovoltaic system ==
Biological photovoltaic systems are defined by the type of light harvesting material that they employ, and the mode of electron transfer from the biological material to the anode.

=== Light harvesting materials ===
The light harvesting materials employed in biological photovoltaic devices can be categorised by their complexity; more complex materials are typically less efficient but more robust.

==== Isolated photosystems ====
Isolated photosystems offer the most direct connection between water photolysis and anode reduction. Typically, photosystems are isolated and adsorbed to a conductive surface. A soluble redox mediator (a small molecule capable of accepting and donating electrons) may be required to improve the electrical communication between photosystem and anode. Because other cellular components required for repair are absent, biological photovoltaic systems based on isolated photosystems have relatively short lifetimes (a few hours) and often require low temperatures to improve stability.

==== Sub-cellular fractions ====
Sub-cellular fractions of photosynthetic organisms, such as purified thylakoid membranes, can also be used in biological photovoltaic systems. A benefit of using material that contains both photosystem II and photosystem I is that electrons extracted from water by photosystem II can be donated to the anode at a more negative redox potential (from the reductive end of photosystem I). A redox mediator (e.g. ferricyanide) is required to transfer electrons between the photosynthetic components and the anode.

==== Whole organisms ====
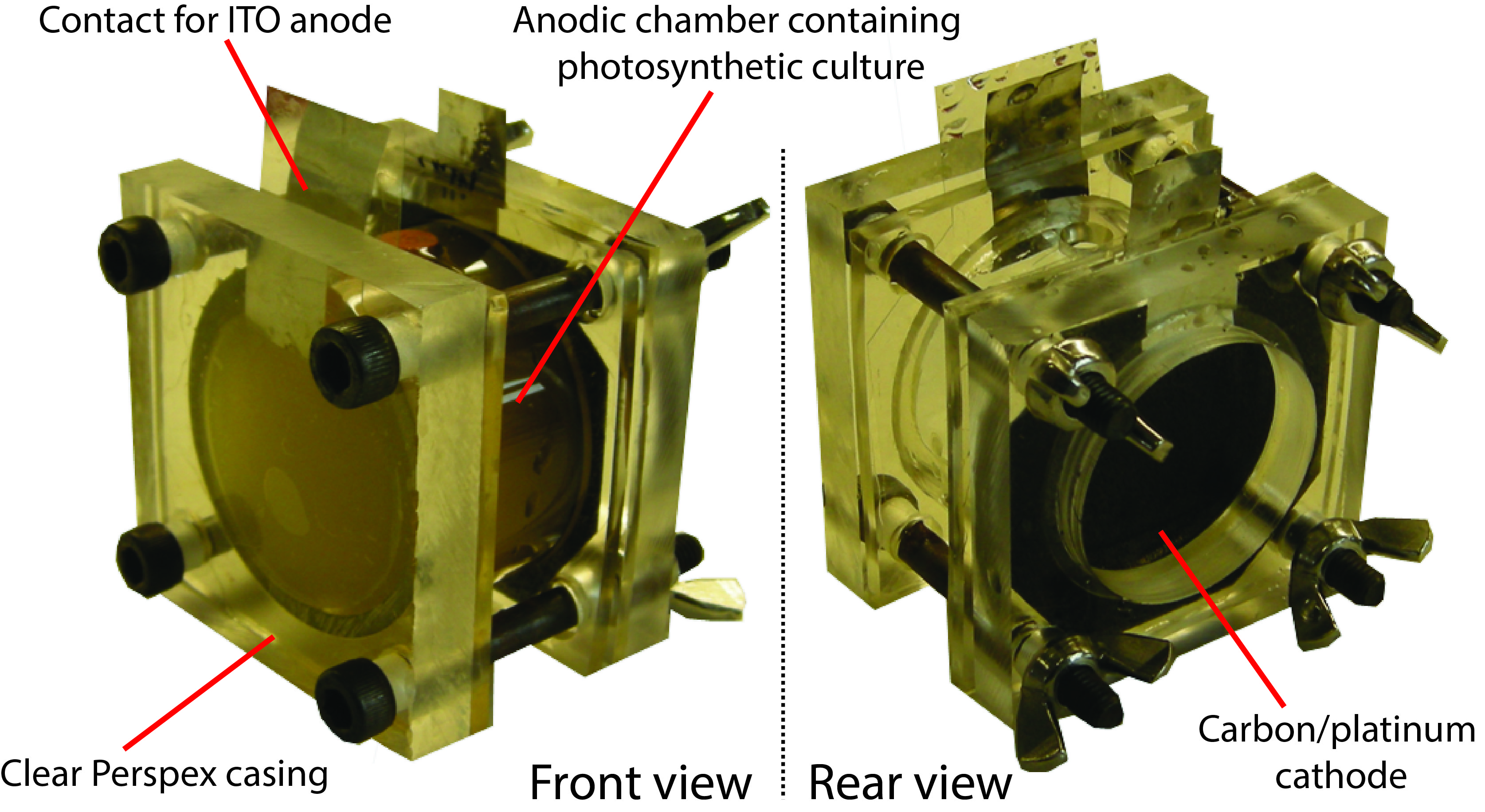
This biological photovoltaic system uses cyanobacterium growing in suspension, with an indium tin oxide anode.

Biological photovoltaic systems that employ whole organisms are the most robust type, and lifetimes of multiple months have been observed. The insulating outer membranes of whole cells impedes electron transfer from the sites of electron generation inside the cell to the anode. As a result, conversion efficiencies are low unless lipid-soluble redox mediators are included in the system. Cyanobacteria are typically used in these systems because their relatively simple arrangement of intracellular membranes compared to eukaryotic algae facilitates electron export. Potential catalysts such as platinum can be used to increase permeability of the cellular membrane.

=== Electron transfer to the anode ===
Reduction of the anode by the photosynthetic material can be achieved by a direct electron transfer, or via a soluble redox mediator. Redox mediators may be lipid-soluble (e.g. vitamin K2), allowing them to pass through cell membranes, and can either be added to the system or produced by the biological material.

==== Inherent electrode reduction activity ====
Isolated photosystems and sub-cellular photosynthetic fractions may be able to directly reduce the anode if the biological redox components are close enough to the electrode for electron transfer to occur. In contrast to organisms such as dissimilatory metal reducing bacteria, algae and cyanobacteria are poorly adapted for extracellular electron export - no molecular mechanisms enabling direct reduction of an insoluble extracellular electron acceptor have been conclusively identified. Nevertheless, a low rate of anode reduction has been observed from whole photosynthetic organisms without the addition of exogenous redox-active compounds. It has been speculated that electron transfer occurs through the release of low concentrations of endogenous redox mediator compounds. Improving the electron export activity of cyanobacteria for use in biological photovoltaic systems is a topic of current research.

==== Artificial electron mediators ====
Redox mediators are often added to experimental systems to improve the rate of electron export from the biological material and/or electron transfer to the anode, especially when whole cells are employed as the light harvesting material. Quinones, phenazines, and viologens have all been successfully employed to increase current output from photosynthetic organisms in biological photovoltaic devices. Adding artificial mediators is considered an unsustainable practice in scaled-up applications, so most modern research is on mediator-free systems.

== Efficiency ==
The conversion efficiency of biological photovoltaic devices is presently too low for scaled-up versions to achieve grid parity. Genetic engineering approaches are being employed to increase the current output from photosynthetic organisms for use in biological photovoltaic systems.
