= Photohydrogen =

Hydrogen produced via light

In photochemistry, photohydrogen is hydrogen produced with the help of artificial or natural light. This is how the leaf of a tree splits water molecules into protons (hydrogen ions), electrons (to make carbohydrates) and oxygen (released into the air as a waste product). Photohydrogen may also be produced by the photodissociation of water by ultraviolet light.

Photohydrogen is sometimes discussed in the context of obtaining renewable energy from sunlight, by using microscopic organisms such as bacteria or algae. These organisms create hydrogen with the help of hydrogenase enzymes which convert protons derived from the water splitting reaction into hydrogen gas which can then be collected and used as a biofuel.

== See also ==
- Solar hydrogen panel
- Photofermentation
- Biological hydrogen production (Algae)
- Photoelectrochemical cell
- Photosynthesis
- Hydrogen cycle
- Hydrogen economy
