= Planta (journal) =

- Discipline: Plant Biology
- Language: English
- Edited by: A. Melis, D. Bartels

Publication details
- History: 1925-present
- Publisher: Springer Science+Business Media
- Frequency: Monthly
- Impact factor: 4.540 (2021)

Standard abbreviations
- ISO 4: Planta

Indexing
- CODEN: PLANAB
- ISSN: 0032-0935 (print); 1432-2048 (web)
- LCCN: 27009713
- OCLC no.: 612356975

Links
- Journal homepage; Online access

Planta is a monthly peer-reviewed scientific journal covering all areas of plant biology. It was established in 1925 and is published by Springer Science+Business Media. The editors-in-chief are Anastasios Melis (UC-Berkeley) and Dorothea Bartels (Universitat Bonn). According to the Journal Citation Reports, the journal has a 2021 impact factor of 4.540.
