= Barnett Cohen =

Russian-born American bacteriologist

Barnett Cohen (1891–1952) was a Russian-born American bacteriologist who performed the first ultra-microscopic surgeries, including on amoeba.

Cohen received his Ph.D. from Yale University. He was president of the Society of American Bacteriologists, and a member of the American Association for the Advancement of Science, the American Chemical Society, and American Public Health Association.
