= Electrohydrogenesis =

Generating hydrogen from organic matter

Electrohydrogenesis or biocatalyzed electrolysis is the name given to a process for generating hydrogen gas from organic matter being decomposed by bacteria. This process uses a modified fuel cell to contain the organic matter and water. A small amount, 0.2–0.8 V of electricity is used, the original article reports an overall energy efficiency of 288% can be achieved (this is computed relative to the amount of electricity used, waste heat lowers the overall efficiency). This work was reported by Cheng and Logan.

== See also ==
- Biohydrogen
- Electrochemical reduction of carbon dioxide
- Electromethanogenesis
- Fermentative hydrogen production
- Microbial fuel cell
