= Biohydrogen =

Hydrogen that is produced biologically

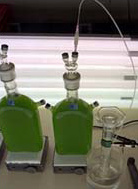
Microbial hydrogen production.

Biohydrogen is H_{2} that is produced biologically. Interest is high in this technology because H_{2} is a clean fuel and can be readily produced from certain kinds of biomass, including biological waste. Furthermore some photosynthetic microorganisms are capable of producing H_{2} directly from water splitting using light as energy source.

Besides the promising possibilities of biological hydrogen production, many challenges characterize this technology. First challenges include those intrinsic to H_{2}, such as storage and transportation of an explosive noncondensible gas. Additionally, hydrogen producing organisms are poisoned by O_{2} and yields of H_{2} are often low.

== Biochemical principles ==
The main reactions driving hydrogen formation involve the oxidation of substrates to obtain electrons. Then, these electrons are transferred to free protons to form molecular hydrogen. This proton reduction reaction is normally performed by an enzyme family known as hydrogenases.

In heterotrophic organisms, electrons are produced during the fermentation of sugars. Hydrogen gas is produced in many types of fermentation as a way to regenerate NAD^{+} from NADH. Electrons are transferred to ferredoxin, or can be directly accepted from NADH by a hydrogenase, producing H_{2}. Because of this most of the reactions start with glucose, which is converted to acetic acid.

$$\ce{C6H12O6 + 2 H2O ->  2 CH3COOH  +  2 CO2  +  4 H2}$$

A related reaction gives formate instead of carbon dioxide:

$$\ce{C6H12O6 + 2 H2O ->  2 CH3COOH  +  2 HCOOH  +  2 H2}$$

These reactions are exergonic by 216 and 209 kcal/mol, respectively.

It has been estimated that 99% of all organisms utilize or produce dihydrogen (H_{2}). Most of these species are microbes and their ability to use or produce H_{2} as a metabolite arises from the expression of H_{2} metalloenzymes known as hydrogenases. Enzymes within this widely diverse family are commonly sub-classified into three different types based on the active site metal content: [FeFe]-hydrogenases (iron-iron), [NiFe]-hydrogenases (nickel-iron) hydrogenases, and [Fe]-hydrogenases (iron-only). Many organisms express these enzymes. Notable examples include members of the genera Clostridium, Desulfovibrio, Ralstonia, or the pathogen Helicobacter, which are mostly strict anaerobes or facultative microorganisms. Other microorganisms such green algae, also express highly active hydrogenases, as is the case for members of the genera Chlamydomonas.

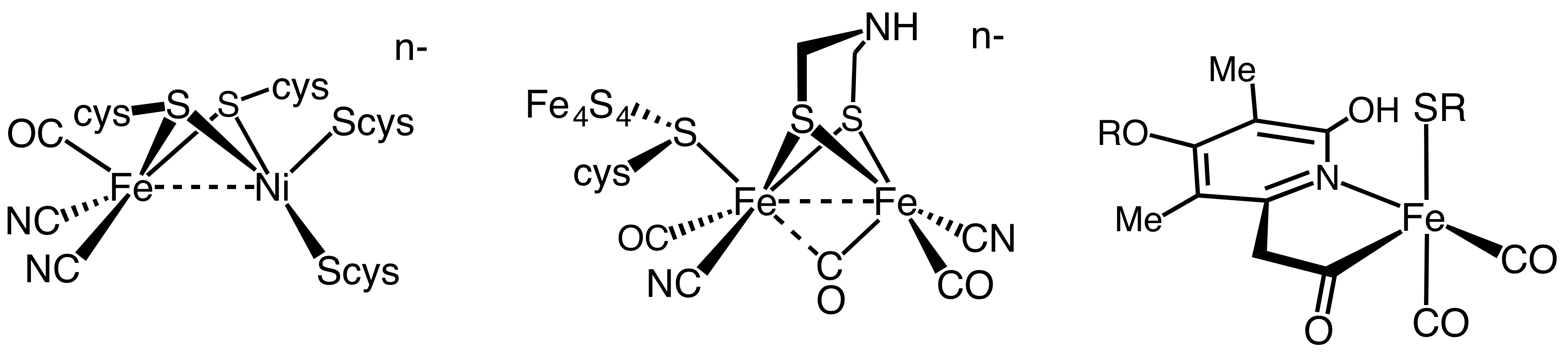
The active site structures of the three types of hydrogenase enzymes.

Due to the extreme diversity of hydrogenase enzymes, on-going efforts are focused on screening for novel enzymes with improved features, as well as engineering already characterized hydrogenases to confer them more desirable characteristics.

== Production by algae ==
The biological hydrogen production with algae is a method of photobiological water splitting which is done in a closed photobioreactor based on the production of hydrogen as a solar fuel by algae. Algae produce hydrogen under certain conditions. In 2000 it was discovered that if C. reinhardtii algae are deprived of sulfur they will switch from the production of oxygen, as in normal photosynthesis, to the production of hydrogen.

Green algae express [FeFe] hydrogenases, being some of them considered the most efficient hydrogenases with turnover rates superior to 10^{4} s^{−1}. This remarkable catalytic efficiency is nonetheless shadowed by its extreme sensitivity to oxygen, being irreversibly inactivated by O_{2}_{.} When the cells are deprived from sulfur, oxygen evolution stops due to photo-damage of photosystem II, in this state the cells start consuming O_{2} and provide the ideal anaerobic environment for the native [FeFe] hydrogenases to catalyze H_{2} production.

=== Photosynthesis ===
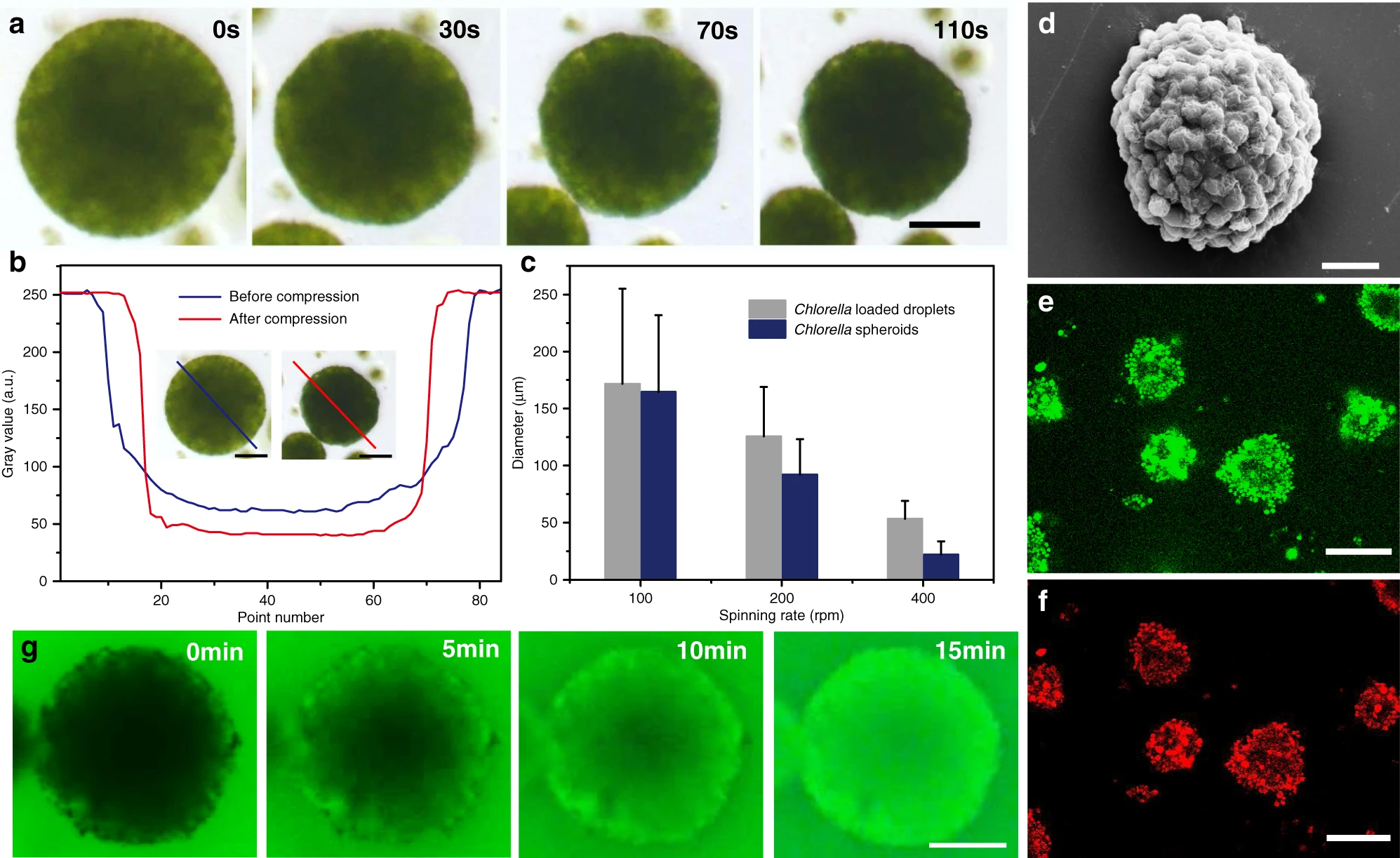
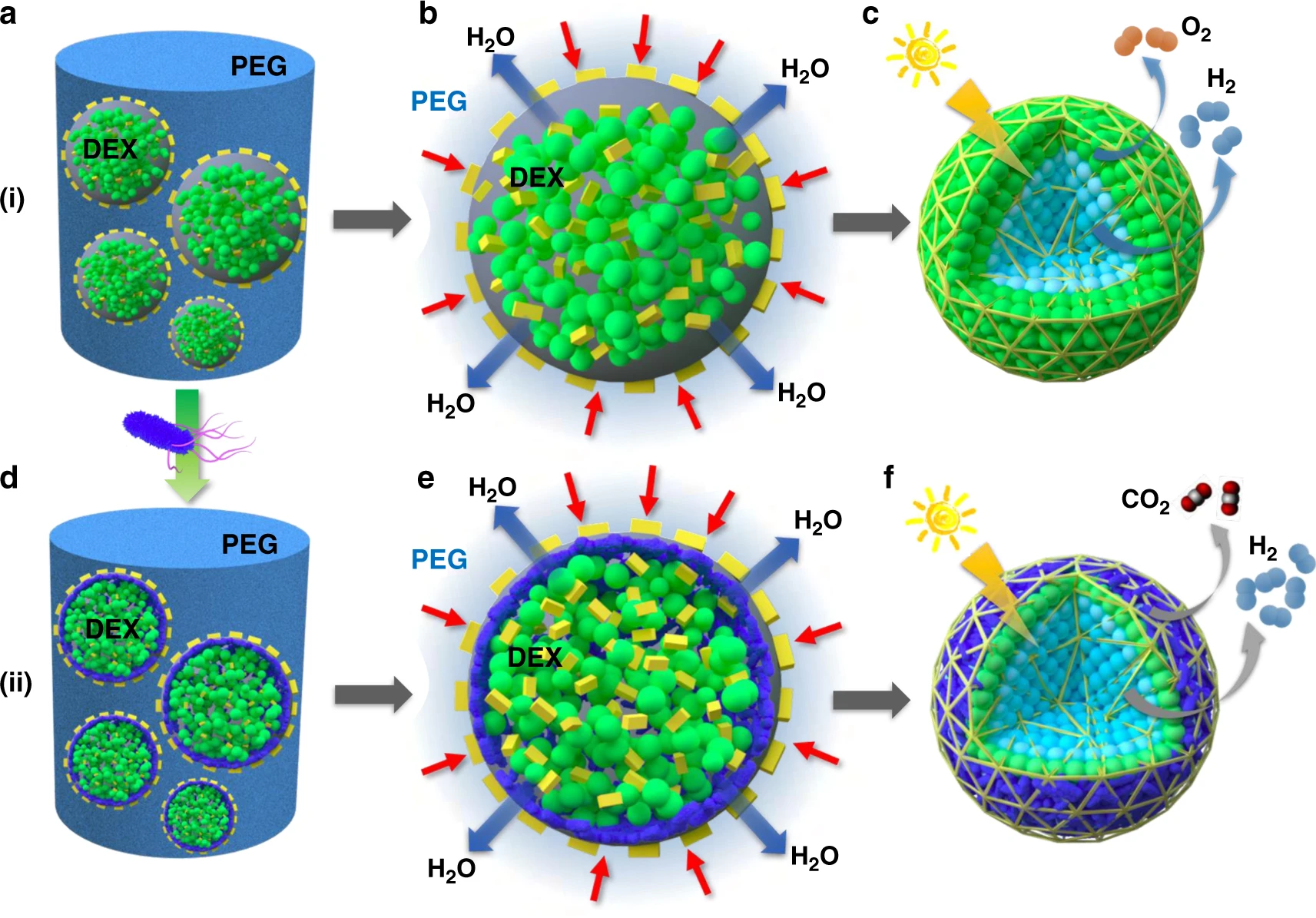
Algal cell-based bioreactors that can produce hydrogen

Photosynthesis in cyanobacteria and green algae splits water into hydrogen ions and electrons. The electrons are transported over ferredoxins. Fe-Fe-hydrogenases (enzymes) combine them into hydrogen gas. In Chlamydomonas reinhardtii Photosystem II produces in direct conversion of sunlight 80% of the electrons that end up in the hydrogen gas.

In 2020 scientists reported the development of algal-cell based micro-emulsion for multicellular spheroid microbial reactors capable of producing hydrogen alongside either oxygen or CO_{2} via photosynthesis in daylight under air. Enclosing the microreactors with synergistic bacteria was shown to increase levels of hydrogen production via reduction of O_{2} concentrations.

=== Improving production by light harvesting antenna reduction ===
The chlorophyll (Chl) antenna size in green algae is minimized, or truncated, to maximize photobiological solar conversion efficiency and H_{2} production. It has been shown that Light-harvesting complex photosystem II light-harvesting protein LHCBM9 promotes efficient light energy dissipation. The truncated Chl antenna size minimizes absorption and wasteful dissipation of sunlight by individual cells, resulting in better light utilization efficiency and greater photosynthetic efficiency when the green alga are grown as a mass culture in bioreactors.

=== Economics ===
With current reports for algae-based biohydrogen, it would take about 25,000 square kilometres (9,700 sq mi) algal farming to produce biohydrogen equivalent to the energy provided by gasoline in the US alone. This area represents approximately 10% of the area devoted to growing soya in the US.

=== Bioreactor design issues ===
- Restriction of photosynthetic hydrogen production by accumulation of a proton gradient.
- Competitive inhibition of photosynthetic hydrogen production by carbon dioxide.
- Requirement for bicarbonate binding at photosystem II (PSII) for efficient photosynthetic activity.
- Competitive drainage of electrons by oxygen in algal hydrogen production.
- Economics must reach competitive price to other sources of energy and the economics are dependent on several parameters.
- A major technical obstacle is the efficiency in converting solar energy into chemical energy stored in molecular hydrogen.

Attempts are in progress to solve these problems via bioengineering.

== Production by cyanobacteria ==
Biological hydrogen production is also observed in nitrogen-fixing cyanobacteria. This microorganisms can grow forming filaments. Under nitrogen-limited conditions some cells can specialize and form heterocysts, which ensures an anaerobic intracellular space to ease N_{2} fixation by the nitrogenase enzyme expressed also inside.

Under nitrogen-fixation conditions, the nitrogenase enzyme accepts electrons and consume ATP to break the triple dinitrogen bond and reduce it to ammonia. During the catalytic cycle of the nitrogenase enzyme, molecular hydrogen is also produced.

$\ce{N2 + 8 H+ + 8NAD(P)H + 16 ATP-> 2 NH3 + H2 + 16 ADP + 16 Pi + 8 NAD(P)+}$

Nevertheless, since the production of H_{2} is an important loss of energy for the cells, most of nitrogen fixing cyanobacteria also feature at least one uptake hydrogenase. Uptake hydrogenases exhibit a catalytic bias towards oxygen oxidation, thus can assimilate the produced H_{2} as a way to recover part of the energy invested during the nitrogen fixation process.

== History ==
In 1933, Marjory Stephenson and her student Stickland reported that cell suspensions catalysed the reduction of methylene blue with H_{2}. Six years later, Hans Gaffron observed that the green photosynthetic alga Chlamydomonas reinhardtii, would sometimes produce hydrogen. In the late 1990s Anastasios Melis discovered that deprivation of sulfur induces the alga to switch from the production of oxygen (normal photosynthesis) to the production of hydrogen. He found that the enzyme responsible for this reaction is hydrogenase, but that the hydrogenase lost this function in the presence of oxygen. Melis also discovered that depleting the amount of sulfur available to the algae interrupted their internal oxygen flow, allowing the hydrogenase an environment in which it can react, causing the algae to produce hydrogen. Chlamydomonas moewusii is also a promising strain for the production of hydrogen.

== Industrial hydrogen ==
Competing for biohydrogen, at least for commercial applications, are many mature industrial processes. Steam reforming of natural gas - sometimes referred to as steam methane reforming (SMR) - is the most common method of producing bulk hydrogen at about 95% of the world production.

$$\ce{CH4 + H2O <-> CO + 3 H2}$$

== See also ==
- Algaculture – Aquaculture involving the farming of algae
- Hydrogen production – Industrial production of molecular hydrogen
- Hydrogenase – Class of enzymes that catalyse the reversible oxidation of molecular hydrogen
- Photohydrogen – Hydrogen produced via light
- Timeline of hydrogen technologies
