= Water splitting =

Chemical reaction

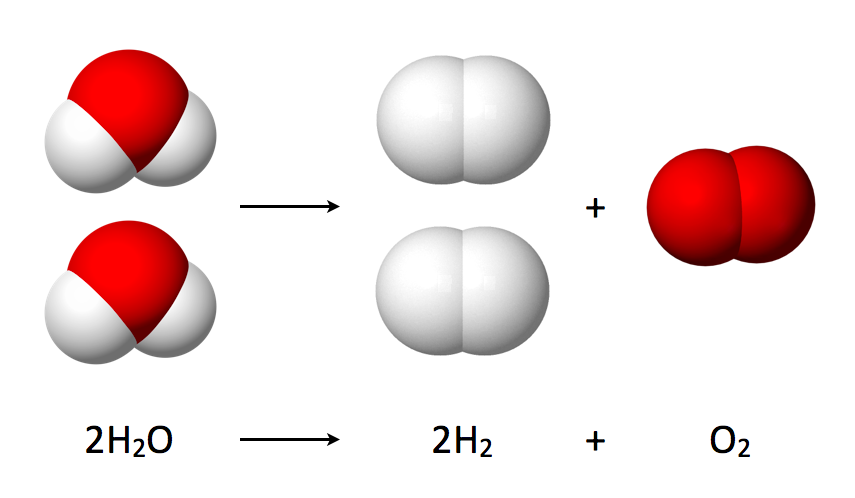
Diagram of the chemical equation of the electrolysis of water, a form of water splitting.

Water splitting is the endergonic chemical reaction in which water is broken down into oxygen and hydrogen:

2 H_{2}O → 2 H_{2} + O_{2}

Efficient and economical water splitting would be a technological breakthrough that could underpin a hydrogen economy. A version of water splitting occurs in photosynthesis, but hydrogen is not released but rather used ionically to drive the Calvin cycle. The reverse of water splitting is the basis of the hydrogen fuel cell. Water splitting using solar radiation has not been commercialized.

== Electrolysis ==
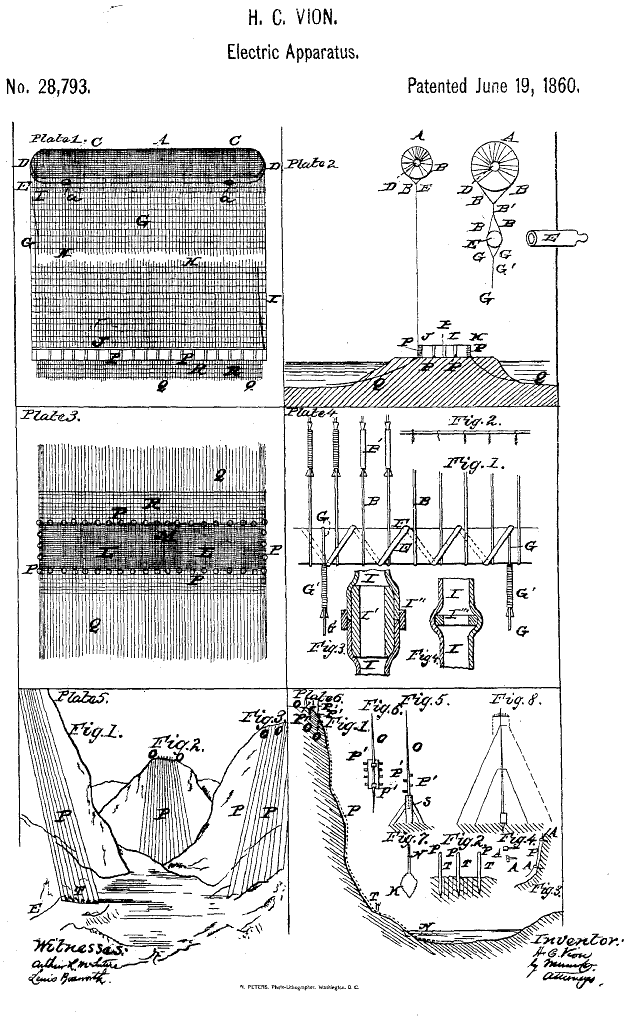
Atmospheric electricity utilization for the chemical reaction in which water is separated into oxygen and hydrogen. (Image via: Vion, US patent 28793. June 1860.)

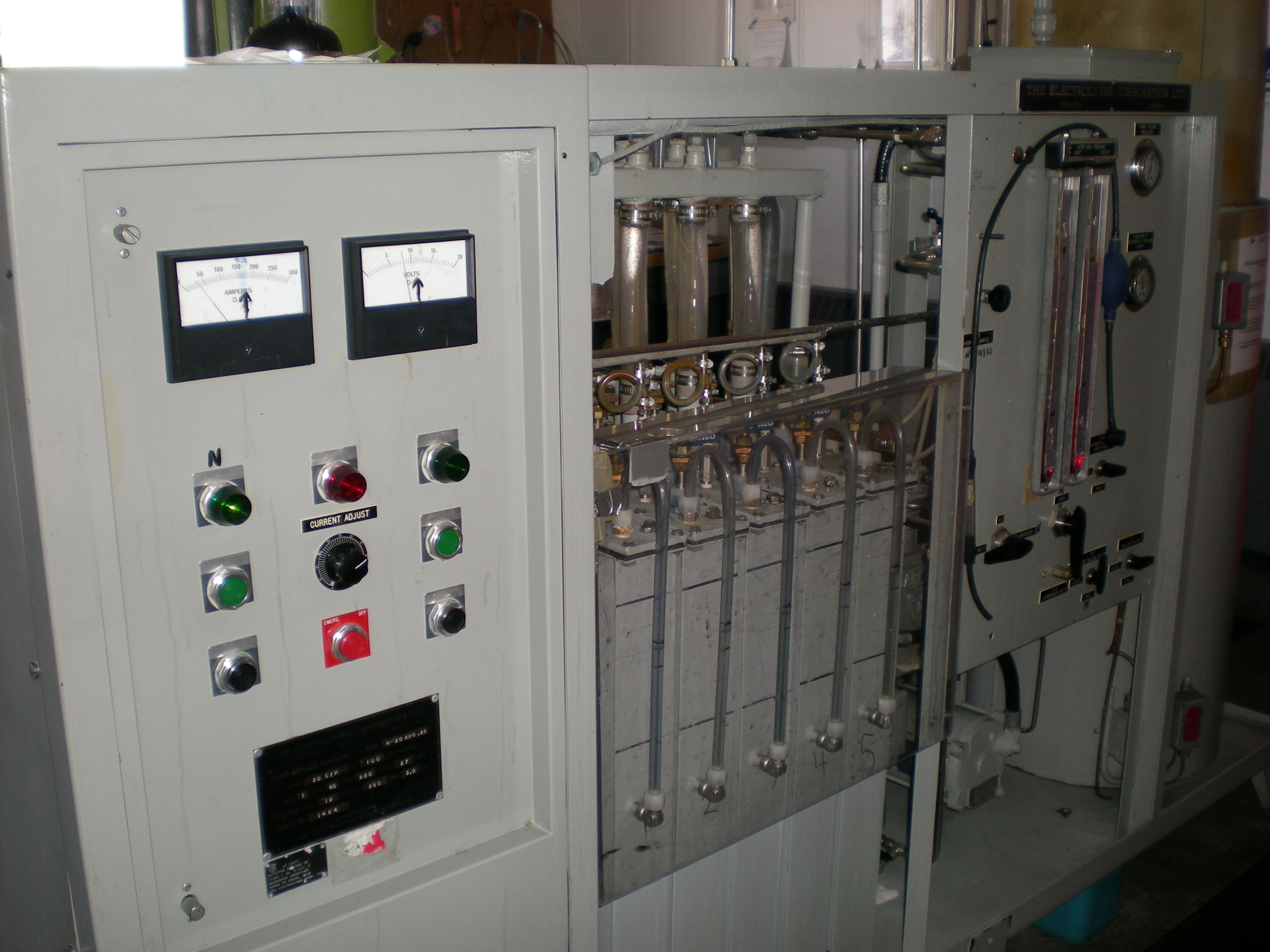
Electrolyser front with electrical panel in foreground

Electrolysis of water is the decomposition of water (H_{2}O) into oxygen (O_{2}) and hydrogen (H_{2}):

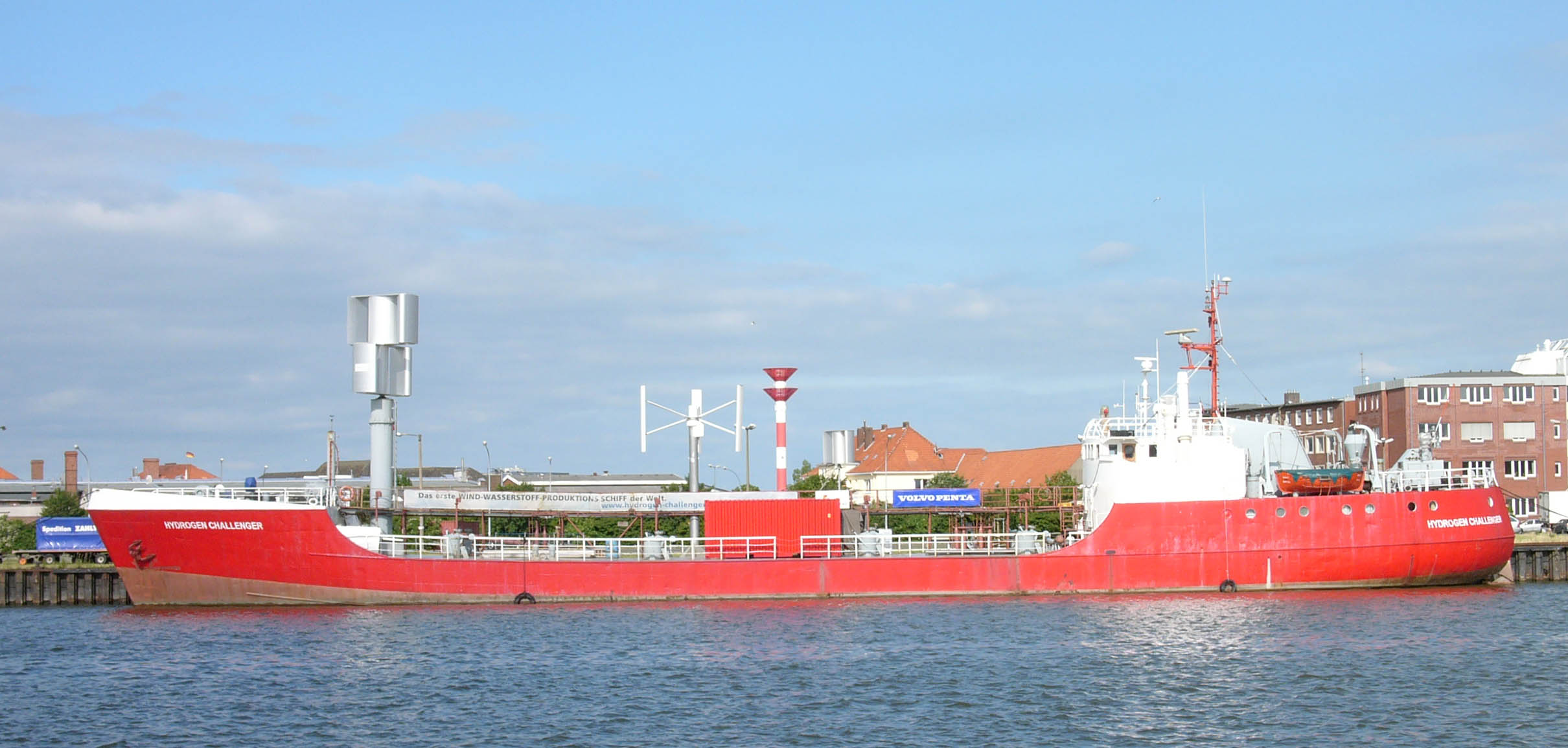
Water electrolysis ship Hydrogen Challenger

Production of hydrogen from water is energy intensive. Usually, the electricity consumed is more valuable than the hydrogen produced, so this method has not been widely used. In contrast with low-temperature electrolysis, high-temperature electrolysis (HTE) of water converts more of the initial heat energy into chemical energy (hydrogen), potentially doubling efficiency to about 50%. Because some of the energy in HTE is supplied in the form of heat, less of the energy must be converted twice (from heat to electricity, and then to chemical form), and so the process is more efficient.

High-temperature electrolysis (also HTE or steam electrolysis) is a method for the production of hydrogen from water with oxygen as a by-product.

== Water splitting in photosynthesis ==
A version of water splitting occurs in photosynthesis but the electrons are shunted, not to protons, but to the electron transport chain in photosystem II. The electrons are used to reduce carbon dioxide, which eventually becomes incorporated into sugars.

Photo-excitation of photosystem I initiates electron transfer to a series of electron acceptors, eventually reducing NADP^{+} to NADPH. The oxidized photosystem I captures electrons from photosystem II through a series of steps involving plastoquinone, cytochromes, and plastocyanin. Oxidized photosystem II oxidizes the oxygen-evolving complex (OEC), which converts water into O_{2} and protons. Since the active site of the OEC contains manganese, much research has aimed at synthetic Mn compounds as catalysts for water oxidation.

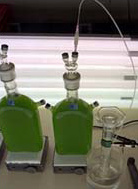
An algae bioreactor for hydrogen production.

In biological hydrogen production, the electrons produced by the photosystem are shunted not to a chemical synthesis apparatus but to hydrogenases, resulting in formation of H_{2}. This biohydrogen is produced in a bioreactor.

== Photoelectrochemical water splitting ==
Using electricity produced by photovoltaic systems potentially offers the cleanest way to produce hydrogen, other than nuclear, wind, geothermal, and hydroelectric. Again, water is broken down into hydrogen and oxygen by electrolysis, but the electrical energy is obtained by a photoelectrochemical cell (PEC) process. The system is also named artificial photosynthesis.

Catalysis and proton-relay membranes are often the focus on development.

== Photocatalytic water splitting ==
The conversion of solar energy into hydrogen by means of water splitting process might be more efficient if it is assisted by photocatalysts suspended in water rather than a photovoltaic or an electrolytic system, so that the reaction takes place in one step.

== Radiolysis ==
Energetic nuclear radiation can break the chemical bonds of a water molecule. In the Mponeng gold mine, South Africa, researchers found in a naturally high radiation zone a community dominated by Desulforudis audaxviator, a new phylotype of Desulfotomaculum, feeding on primarily radiolytically produced H_{2}.

== Thermal decomposition of water ==
In thermolysis, water molecules split into hydrogen and oxygen. For example, at 2,200 °C (2,470 K; 3,990 °F) about three percent of all H_{2}O are dissociated into various combinations of hydrogen and oxygen atoms, mostly H, H_{2}, O, O_{2}, and OH. Other reaction products like H_{2}O_{2} or HO_{2} remain minor. At the very high temperature of 3,000 °C (3,270 K; 5,430 °F) more than half of the water molecules are decomposed. At ambient temperatures only one molecule in 100 trillion dissociates by the effect of heat. The high temperature requirements and material constraints have limited the applications of the thermal decomposition approach.

Other research includes thermolysis on defective carbon substrates, thus making hydrogen production possible at temperatures just under 1,000 °C (1,270 K; 1,830 °F).

One side benefit of a nuclear reactor that produces both electricity and hydrogen is that it can shift production between the two. For instance, a nuclear plant might produce electricity during the day and hydrogen at night, matching its electrical generation profile to the daily variation in demand. If the hydrogen can be produced economically, this scheme would compete favorably with existing grid energy storage schemes. As of 2005, there was sufficient hydrogen demand in the United States that all daily peak generation could be handled by such plants.

The hybrid thermoelectric copper–chlorine cycle is a cogeneration system using the waste heat from nuclear reactors, specifically the CANDU supercritical water reactor.

=== Solar-thermal ===
Concentrated solar power can achieve the high temperatures necessary to split water. Hydrosol-2 is a 100-kilowatt pilot plant at the Plataforma Solar de Almería in Spain which uses sunlight to obtain the required 800 to 1,200 °C (1,070 to 1,470 K; 1,470 to 2,190 °F) to split water. Hydrosol II has been in operation since 2008. The design of this 100-kilowatt pilot plant is based on a modular concept. As a result, it may be possible that this technology could be readily scaled up to megawatt range by multiplying the available reactor units and by connecting the plant to heliostat fields (fields of sun-tracking mirrors) of a suitable size.

Material constraints due to the required high temperatures are reduced by the design of a membrane reactor with simultaneous extraction of hydrogen and oxygen that exploits a defined thermal gradient and the fast diffusion of hydrogen. With concentrated sunlight as heat source and only water in the reaction chamber, the produced gases are very clean with the only possible contaminant being water. A "Solar Water Cracker" with a concentrator of about 100 m^{2} can produce almost one kilogram of hydrogen per sunshine hour.

The sulfur–iodine cycle (S–I cycle) is a series of thermochemical processes used to produce hydrogen. The S–I cycle consists of three chemical reactions whose net reactant is water and whose net products are hydrogen and oxygen. All other chemicals are recycled. The S–I process requires an efficient source of heat.

More than 352 thermochemical cycles have been described for water splitting by thermolysis. These cycles promise to produce hydrogen and oxygen from water and heat without using electricity. Since all the input energy for such processes is heat, they can be more efficient than high-temperature electrolysis. This is because the efficiency of electricity production is inherently limited. Thermochemical production of hydrogen using chemical energy from coal or natural gas is generally not considered, because the direct chemical path is more efficient.

For all the thermochemical processes, the summary reaction is that of the decomposition of water:
$$\ce{2H2O <=>[\ce{Heat}] 2H2{} + O2}$$

Thermochemical cycle	LHV efficiency	Temperature (°C/F)
Cerium(IV) oxide–cerium(III) oxide cycle (CeO_{2}/Ce_{2}O_{3})	? %	2,000 °C (3,630 °F)
Hybrid sulfur cycle (HyS)	43%	900 °C (1,650 °F)
Sulfur–iodine cycle (S–I cycle)	38%	900 °C (1,650 °F)
Cadmium sulfate cycle	46%	1,000 °C (1,830 °F)
Barium sulfate cycle	39%	1,000 °C (1,830 °F)
Manganese sulfate cycle	35%	1,100 °C (2,010 °F)
Zinc–zinc oxide cycle (Zn/ZnO)	44%	1,900 °C (3,450 °F)
Hybrid cadmium cycle	42%	1,600 °C (2,910 °F)
Cadmium carbonate cycle	43%	1,600 °C (2,910 °F)
Iron oxide cycle (Fe_{3}O_{4}/FeO)	42%	2,200 °C (3,990 °F)
Sodium manganese cycle	49%	1,560 °C (2,840 °F)
Nickel manganese ferrite cycle	43%	1,800 °C (3,270 °F)
Zinc manganese ferrite cycle	43%	1,800 °C (3,270 °F)
Copper–chlorine cycle (Cu–Cl)	41%	550 °C (1,022 °F)
