= Zinc–zinc oxide cycle =

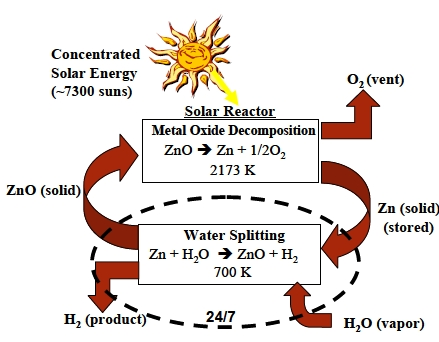
The Zn/ZnO cycle

For chemical reactions, the zinc–zinc oxide cycle or Zn–ZnO cycle is a two step thermochemical cycle based on zinc and zinc oxide for hydrogen production with a typical efficiency around 40%.

== Process description ==
The thermochemical two-step water splitting process uses redox systems:

- Dissociation: ZnO → Zn + 1/2 O_{2}
- Hydrolysis: Zn + H_{2}O → ZnO + H_{2}

For the first endothermic step concentrating solar power is used in which zinc oxide is thermally dissociated at 1,900 °C (3,450 °F) into zinc and oxygen. In the second non-solar exothermic step zinc reacts at 427 °C (801 °F) with water and produces hydrogen and zinc oxide. The temperature level is realized by using a solar power tower and a set of heliostats to collect the solar thermal energy.

== See also ==
- Cerium(IV) oxide–cerium(III) oxide cycle
- Copper–chlorine cycle
- Hydrosol-2
- Hybrid sulfur cycle
- Iron oxide cycle
- Sulfur–iodine cycle
