= Copper–chlorine cycle =

Thermochemical Cycle to produce Hydrogen from Water

Simplified diagram of the Copper–Chlorine cycle

The copper–chlorine cycle (Cu–Cl cycle) is a four-step thermochemical cycle for the production of hydrogen. The Cu–Cl cycle is a hybrid process that employs both thermochemical and electrolysis steps. It has a maximum temperature requirement of about 530 degrees Celsius.

The Cu–Cl cycle involves four chemical reactions for water splitting, whose net reaction decomposes water into hydrogen and oxygen. All other chemicals are recycled. The Cu–Cl process can be linked with nuclear plants or other heat sources such as solar and industrial waste heat to potentially achieve higher efficiencies, lower environmental impact and lower costs of hydrogen production than any other conventional technology.

The Cu–Cl cycle is one of the prominent thermochemical cycles under development within the Generation IV International Forum (GIF). Through GIF, over a dozen countries around the world are developing the next generation of nuclear reactors for highly efficient production of both electricity and hydrogen.

India has inaugurated the world’s first Hydrogen Production Facility based on the Copper-Chlorine (Cu-Cl) Thermochemical Cycle utilizing nuclear process heat generated from the Fast Breeder Test Reactor at the Indira Gandhi Centre for Atomic Research (IGCAR), Kalpakkam.

== Process description ==
The four reactions in the Cu–Cl cycle are listed as follows:

1. 2 Cu + 2 HCl(g) → 2 CuCl(l) + H_{2}(g) (430–475 °C)
2. 2 CuCl_{2} + H_{2}O(g) → Cu_{2}OCl_{2} + 2 HCl(g) (400 °C)
3. 2 Cu_{2}OCl_{2} → 4 CuCl + O_{2}(g) (500 °C)
4. 2 CuCl → CuCl_{2}(aq) + Cu (ambient-temperature electrolysis)

Net reaction: 2 H_{2}O → 2 H_{2} + O_{2}
Legend: (g)—gas; (l)—liquid; (aq)—aqueous solution; the balance of the species are in a solid phase.

Atomic Energy of Canada Limited has demonstrated experimentally a CuCl electrolyzer in which hydrogen is produced electrolytically at the cathode and Cu(I) is oxidized to Cu(II) at the anode, thereby combining above steps 1 and 4 to eliminate the intermediate production and subsequent transport of solid copper.

Approximately 50% of the heat required to drive this reaction can be captured from the reaction itself. The other heat can be provided by any suitable process. Recent research has focused on a cogeneration scheme using the waste heat from nuclear reactors, specifically the CANDU supercritical water reactor.

== Advantages and disadvantages ==
Advantages of the copper–chlorine cycle include lower operating temperatures, the ability to use low-grade waste heat to improve energy efficiency, and potentially lower cost materials. In comparison with other thermochemical cycles, the Cu–Cl process requires relatively low temperatures of up to 530 °C (990 °F).

Another significant merit of this cycle is a relatively low voltage (thus low electrical energy expenditure) that is required for the electrochemical step (0.6 to 1.0 V, perhaps even 0.5 if lower current density can be achieved). The overall efficiency of the Cu–Cl cycle has been estimated to be just over 43%, excluding the additional potential gains of utilizing waste heat in the cycle.

Solids handling between processes and corrosive working fluids present unique challenges for the engineering equipment development. Among others, the following materials are being currently used: spray coatings, nickel alloys, glass-lined steel, refractory materials, and other advanced materials.

== See also ==
- Cerium(IV) oxide–cerium(III) oxide cycle
- Hybrid sulfur cycle
- Iron oxide cycle
- Sulfur–iodine cycle
- Zinc–zinc oxide cycle
