= Bunsen reaction =

Chemical reaction

The Bunsen reaction is a chemical reaction that describes water, sulfur dioxide, and iodine reacting to form sulfuric acid and hydrogen iodide:

2H_{2}O + SO_{2} + I_{2} → H_{2}SO_{4} + 2HI

This reaction is the first step in the sulfur-iodine cycle to produce hydrogen. The products separate into two aqueous layers, with the sulfuric acid floating on top, and a mixture of hydrogen iodide and unreacted iodine on the bottom. While the two layers are generally considered immiscible, small amounts of sulfuric acid may still remain in the hydrogen iodide layer and vice versa. This can lead to unwanted side reactions, one of which precipitates out sulfur, a potential obstruction to the reaction vessel. The reaction is named after Robert Bunsen. He did not discover the reaction, but he described it in detail in 1853.

A similar reaction is the basis for Karl Fischer titration.

Note that at sufficiently high temperatures, concentrated H_{2}SO_{4} may react with HI, giving I_{2}, SO_{2} and H_{2}O, which reverses the reaction. Many chemical processes are reversible reactions, such as ammonia production from N_{2} and H_{2}, and removing the desired product will shift equilibrium to the right of the equation favoring reaction products as per the Le Chatelier principle.
