= Iron oxide cycle =

Simplified diagram of the iron oxide cycle

For chemical reactions, the iron oxide cycle (Fe_{3}O_{4}/FeO) is the original two-step thermochemical cycle proposed for use for hydrogen production. It is based on the reduction and subsequent oxidation of iron ions, particularly the reduction and oxidation between Fe^{3+} and Fe^{2+}. The ferrites, or iron oxide, begins in the form of a spinel and depending on the reaction conditions, dopant metals and support material forms either Wüstites or different spinels.

== Process description ==
The thermochemical two-step water splitting process uses two redox steps. The steps of solar hydrogen production by iron based two-step cycle are:

$$\begin{cases}
\ce{M^{II}Fe2^{III}O4 -> M^{II}O + 2Fe^{II}O + 1/2O2} &\ce{(Reduction)}
\\
\ce{M^{II}O + 2Fe^{II}O + H2O -> M^{II}Fe2^{III}O4 + H2} & \ce{(Oxidation)}
\end{cases}$$

Where M can by any number of metals, often Fe itself, Co, Ni, Mn, Zn or mixtures thereof.

The endothermic reduction step (1) is carried out at high temperatures greater than 1400 °C, though the "Hercynite cycle" is capable of temperatures as low as 1200 °C. The oxidative water splitting step (2) occurs at a lower ~1000 °C temperature which produces the original ferrite material in addition to hydrogen gas. The temperature level is realized by using geothermal heat from magma or a solar power tower and a set of heliostats to collect the solar thermal energy.

== Hercynite cycle ==
Like the traditional iron oxide cycle, the hercynite is based on the oxidation and reduction of iron atoms. However unlike the traditional cycle, the ferrite material reacts with a second metal oxide, aluminum oxide, rather than simply decomposing. The reactions take place via the following two reactions:

$$\begin{cases}
\ce{M^{II}Fe2^{III}O4 + 3Al2O3 -> M^{II}Al2^{III}O4 + 2Fe^{II}Al2^{III}O4 + 1/2O2} &\ce{(Reduction)}
\\
\ce{M^{II}Al2^{III}O4 + 2Fe^{II}Al2^{III}O4 + H2O -> M^{II}Fe2^{III}O4 + 3Al2O3 + H2} &\ce{(Oxidation)}
\end{cases}$$

The reduction step of the hercynite reaction takes place at temperature ~ 200 °C lower than the traditional water splitting cycle (1200 °C). This leads to lower radiation losses, which scale as temperature to the fourth power.

== Advantages and disadvantages ==
The advantages of the ferrite cycles are: they have lower reduction temperatures than other 2-step systems, no metallic gasses are produced, high specific H_{2} production capacity, non-toxicity of the elements used and abundance of the constituent elements.

The disadvantages of the ferrite cycles are: similar reduction and melting temperature of the spinels (except for the hercynite cycle as aluminates have very high melting temperatures), and slow rates of the oxidation, or water splitting, reaction.

== See also ==
- Cerium(IV) oxide-cerium(III) oxide cycle
- Copper-chlorine cycle
- Hybrid sulfur cycle
- Hydrosol-2
- Sulfur-iodine cycle
- Zinc zinc-oxide cycle
