= Hydrogen =

Hydrogen, _{1}H
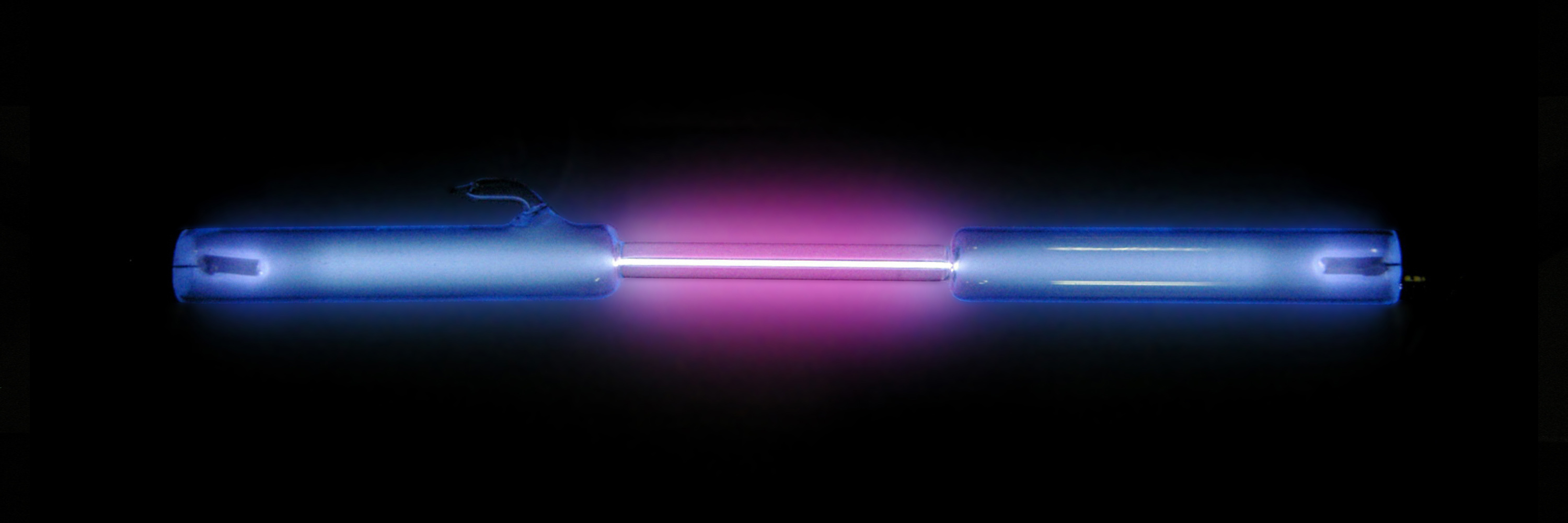
- Purple glow in hydrogen's plasma state.

Hydrogen
- Appearance: Colorless gas

Standard atomic weight A_{r}°(H)
- [1.00784, 1.00811]; 1.0080±0.0002 (abridged)

Hydrogen in the periodic table
Hydrogen																															Helium
Lithium	Beryllium																									Boron	Carbon	Nitrogen	Oxygen	Fluorine	Neon
Sodium	Magnesium																									Aluminium	Silicon	Phosphorus	Sulfur	Chlorine	Argon
Potassium	Calcium															Scandium	Titanium	Vanadium	Chromium	Manganese	Iron	Cobalt	Nickel	Copper	Zinc	Gallium	Germanium	Arsenic	Selenium	Bromine	Krypton
Rubidium	Strontium															Yttrium	Zirconium	Niobium	Molybdenum	Technetium	Ruthenium	Rhodium	Palladium	Silver	Cadmium	Indium	Tin	Antimony	Tellurium	Iodine	Xenon
Caesium	Barium	Lanthanum	Cerium	Praseodymium	Neodymium	Promethium	Samarium	Europium	Gadolinium	Terbium	Dysprosium	Holmium	Erbium	Thulium	Ytterbium	Lutetium	Hafnium	Tantalum	Tungsten	Rhenium	Osmium	Iridium	Platinum	Gold	Mercury (element)	Thallium	Lead	Bismuth	Polonium	Astatine	Radon
Francium	Radium	Actinium	Thorium	Protactinium	Uranium	Neptunium	Plutonium	Americium	Curium	Berkelium	Californium	Einsteinium	Fermium	Mendelevium	Nobelium	Lawrencium	Rutherfordium	Dubnium	Seaborgium	Bohrium	Hassium	Meitnerium	Darmstadtium	Roentgenium	Copernicium	Nihonium	Flerovium	Moscovium	Livermorium	Tennessine	Oganesson
–
↑
H
↓
Li
(none) ← hydrogen → helium
- Atomic number (Z): 1
- Group: group 1: hydrogen and alkali metals
- Period: period 1
- Block: s-block
- Electron configuration: 1s^{1}
- Electrons per shell: 1

Physical properties
- Phase at STP: gas
- Melting point: (H_{2}) 13.99 K (−259.16 °C, −434.49 °F)
- Boiling point: (H_{2}) 20.271 K (−252.879 °C, −423.182 °F)
- Density (at STP): 0.08988 g/L
- when liquid (at m.p.): 0.07 g/cm^{3} (solid: 0.0763 g/cm^{3})
- when liquid (at b.p.): 0.07099 g/cm^{3}
- Triple point: 13.8033 K, 7.041 kPa
- Critical point: 33.19 K, 1.313 MPa
- Heat of fusion: (H_{2}) 0.117 kJ/mol
- Heat of vaporization: (H_{2}) 0.904 kJ/mol
- Molar heat capacity: 14.418 J/(mol·K) (H); 28.836 J/(mol·K) (H_{2})
- Specific heat capacity: 14303.571 J/(kg·K) (H)
Vapor pressure
P (Pa)	1	10	100	1 k	10 k	100 k
at T (K)					15	20

Atomic properties
- Oxidation states: common: −1, +1
- Electronegativity: Pauling scale: 2.20
- Ionization energies: 1st: 1312.0 kJ/mol
- Covalent radius: 31±5 pm
- Van der Waals radius: 120 pm
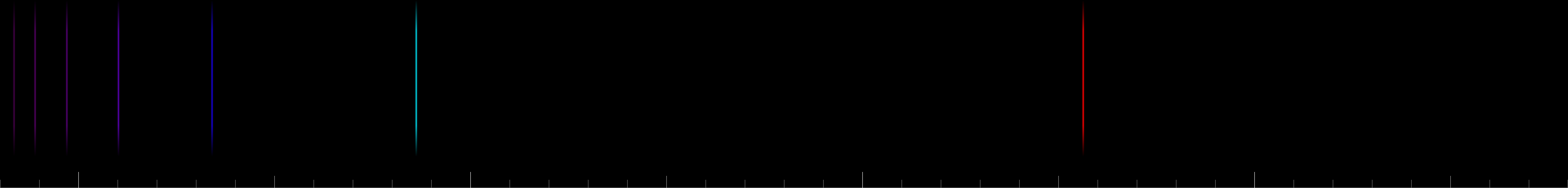
- Spectral lines of hydrogen

Other properties
- Natural occurrence: primordial
- Crystal structure: hexagonal (hP4)
- Lattice constants: a = 378.97 pm c = 618.31 pm (at triple point)
- Thermal conductivity: 0.1805 W/(m⋅K)
- Magnetic ordering: diamagnetic
- Molar magnetic susceptibility: −3.98×10^{−6} cm^{3}/mol (298 K)
- Speed of sound: 1310 m/s (gas, 27 °C)
- CAS Number: 12385-13-6; 1333-74-0 (H_{2})

History
- Naming: name means 'water-former' in Greek
- Discovery and first isolation: Henry Cavendish (1766)
- Named by: Antoine Lavoisier (1783)

Isotopes of hydrogen
Main isotopes			Decay	
Isotope	abundance	half-life (t_{1/2})	mode	product
^{1}H	99.9855%	stable		
^{2}H	0.0115%	stable		
^{3}H	(unstable)	12.32 y	β^{−}	^{3}He
Abundance of deuterium is highly variable

Hydrogen is a chemical element; it has the symbol H and atomic number 1. It is the lightest and most abundant chemical element in the universe, constituting about 75% of all normal matter. Under standard conditions, hydrogen is a gas of diatomic molecules with the formula H_{2}, called dihydrogen, or sometimes hydrogen gas, molecular hydrogen, or simply hydrogen. Dihydrogen is colorless, odorless, non-toxic, and highly combustible. Stars, including the Sun, mainly consist of hydrogen in a plasma state, while on Earth, hydrogen is found as the gas H_{2} (dihydrogen) and in molecules, such as in water and organic compounds. The most common isotope of hydrogen, ^{1}H, consists of one proton, one electron, and no neutrons.

Hydrogen gas was first produced artificially in the 17th century by the reaction of acids with metals. Henry Cavendish, in 1766–1781, identified hydrogen gas as a distinct substance and discovered its property of producing water when burned: this is the origin of hydrogen's name, which means 'water-former' (from Ancient Greek: ὕδωρ, romanized: húdōr, lit. 'water', and γεννάω, gennáō, 'I bring forth'). Understanding the colors of light absorbed and emitted by hydrogen was a crucial part of the development of quantum mechanics.

Hydrogen, typically nonmetallic except under extreme pressure, readily forms covalent bonds with most nonmetals, contributing to the formation of compounds like water and various organic substances. Its role is crucial in acid–base reactions, which mainly involve proton exchange among soluble molecules. In ionic compounds, hydrogen can take the form of either a negatively-charged anion, where it is known as hydride, or as a positively charged cation, H^{+}, hydron. Although tightly bonded to water molecules, hydrons strongly affect the behavior of aqueous solutions, as reflected in the importance of pH. Hydride, on the other hand, is rarely observed because it tends to deprotonate solvents, yielding H_{2}.

In the early universe, neutral hydrogen atoms formed about 370,000 years after the Big Bang as the universe expanded and plasma had cooled enough for electrons to remain bound to protons. After stars began to form, most of the hydrogen in the intergalactic medium was re-ionized.

Nearly all hydrogen production is done by transforming fossil fuels, particularly steam reforming of natural gas. It can also be produced from water or saline by electrolysis, but this process is more expensive. Its main industrial uses include fossil fuel processing and ammonia production for fertilizer. Emerging uses for hydrogen include the use of fuel cells to generate electricity.

== Properties ==
=== Atomic hydrogen ===
==== Electron energy levels ====
The ground state energy level of the electron in a hydrogen atom is −13.6 electronvolts (eV), equivalent to an ultraviolet photon of roughly 91 nanometers wavelength. The energy levels of hydrogen are referred to by consecutive quantum numbers, with $n=1$ being the ground state. The hydrogen spectral series corresponds to emission of light due to transitions from higher to lower energy levels. Each energy level is further split by spin interactions between the electron and proton into four hyperfine levels.

High-precision values for the hydrogen atom energy levels are required for definitions of physical constants. Quantum calculations have identified nine contributions to the energy levels. The eigenvalue from the Dirac equation is the largest contribution. Other terms include relativistic recoil, the self-energy, and the vacuum polarization terms.

==== Nomenclature ====
The standards organization for chemical names, IUPAC, gives general names when the context assumes natural isotope abundance or ignores the isotope. These general names are hydrogen for the neutral atom, hydron for the cation, H^{+}, hydride for the anion, and H^{-}. The name proton is often used for the positively charged cation, but this is strictly correct only for the cation of the dominant isotope ^{1}H.

==== Isotopes ====
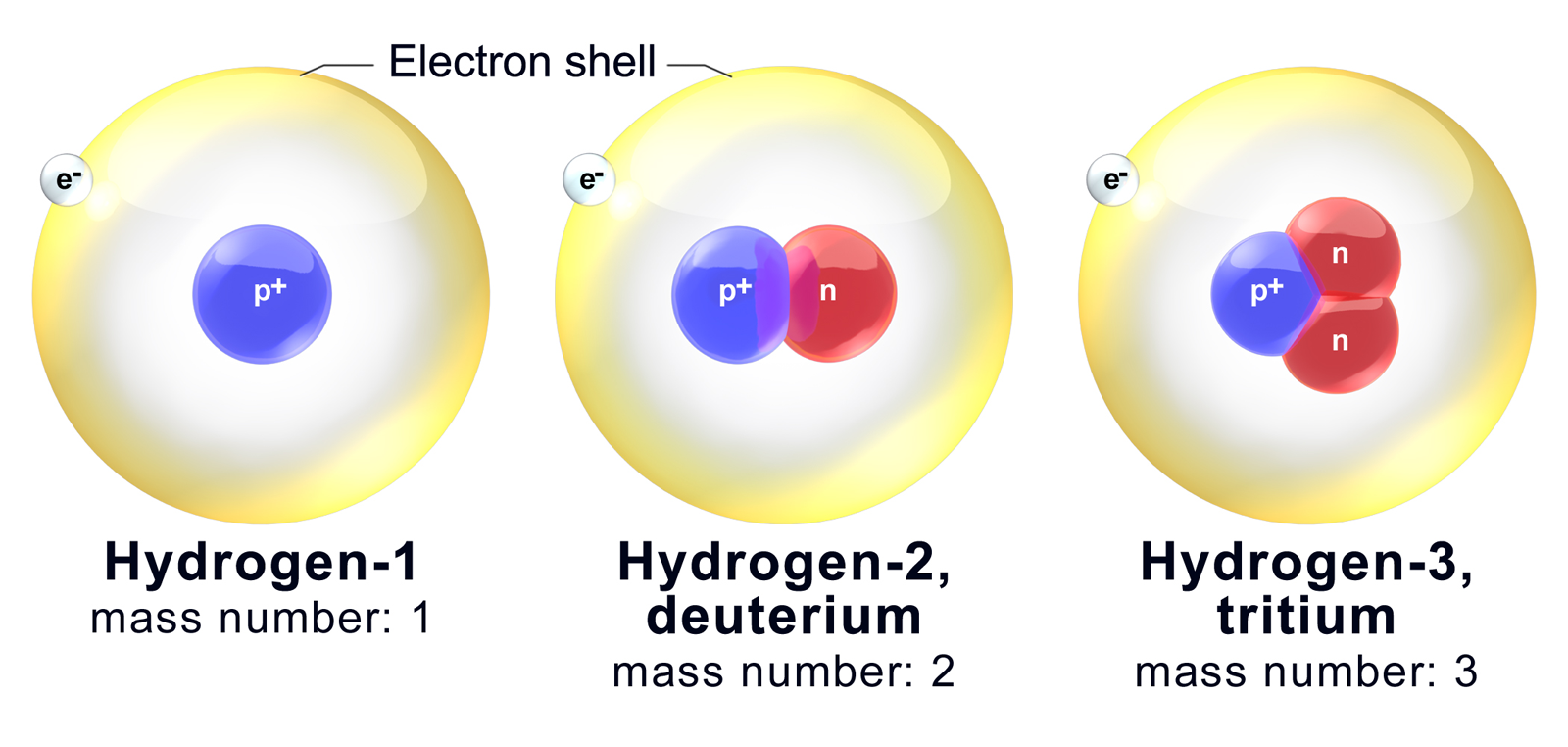
The three naturally-occurring isotopes of hydrogen: hydrogen-1 (protium), hydrogen-2 (deuterium), and hydrogen-3 (tritium)

Hydrogen has three naturally-occurring isotopes, denoted ^{1}H, ^{2}H and ^{3}H. Other, highly-unstable nuclides (^{4}H to ^{7}H) have been synthesized in laboratories but not observed in nature.

^{1}H is the most common hydrogen isotope, with an abundance of >99.98%. Because the nucleus of this isotope consists of only a single proton, it is given the descriptive but rarely used formal name protium. It is the only stable isotope with no neutrons.

^{2}H, the other stable hydrogen isotope, is known as deuterium and contains one proton and one neutron in the nucleus. Nearly all deuterium nuclei in the universe are thought to have been produced in Big Bang nucleosynthesis, and have endured since then. Deuterium is not radioactive, and is not a significant toxicity hazard. Water enriched in molecules that include deuterium instead of normal hydrogen is called heavy water. Deuterium and its compounds are used as a non-radioactive label in chemical experiments and in solvents for ^{1}H-NMR spectroscopy. Heavy water is used as a neutron moderator and coolant for nuclear reactors. Deuterium is also a potential fuel for commercial nuclear fusion.

^{3}H is known as tritium and contains one proton and two neutrons in its nucleus. It is radioactive, decaying into helium-3 through beta decay with a half-life of 12.32 years. It is radioactive enough to be used in luminous paint to enhance the visibility of data displays, such as for painting the hands and dial-markers of watches. The watch glass prevents the small amount of radiation from escaping the case. Small amounts of tritium are produced naturally by cosmic rays striking atmospheric gases; tritium has also been released in nuclear weapons tests. It is used in nuclear fusion, as a tracer in isotope geochemistry, and in specialized self-powered lighting devices. Tritium has also been used in chemical and biological labeling experiments as a radiolabel.

Unique among the elements, distinct names are assigned to hydrogen's isotopes in common use. During the early study of radioactivity, heavy radioisotopes were given their own names, but these are mostly no longer used. The symbols D and T (instead of ^{2}H and ^{3}H) are sometimes used for deuterium and tritium, but the symbol P was already used for phosphorus and thus was not available for protium. In its nomenclatural guidelines, the International Union of Pure and Applied Chemistry (IUPAC) allows any of D, T, ^{2}H, and ^{3}H to be used, though ^{2}H and ^{3}H are preferred.

==== Analogs ====
Antihydrogen (H̅) is the antimatter counterpart to hydrogen. An antihydrogen atom consists of an antiproton with a positron.

Muonic hydrogen atoms resemble hydrogen atoms with their electrons replaced by muons. Muons are short-lived and about 200 times heavier than electrons; muonic hydrogen therefore has a Bohr radius about 200 times smaller than hydrogen's radius. Another exotic atom analogous to hydrogen is muonium (symbol Mu), composed of an antimuon and an electron.

=== Dihydrogen ===
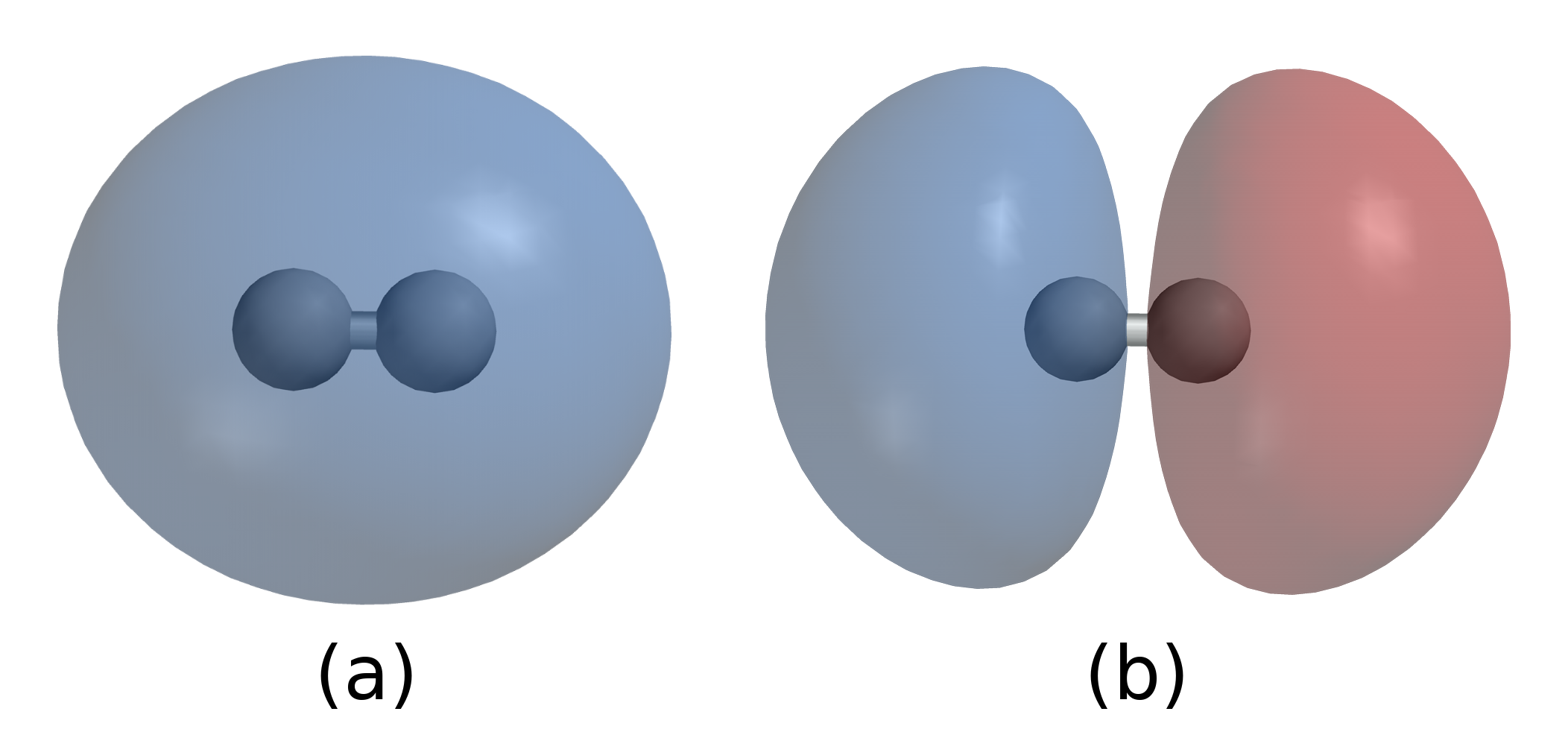
Covalent bonding of two hydrogen atoms to form a hydrogen molecule, H_{2}. In (a) the two nuclei are surrounded by a cloud of two electrons in the bonding orbital that holds the molecule together. (b) shows hydrogen's antibonding orbital, which is higher in energy and is normally not occupied by any electrons.

Under standard conditions, hydrogen is a gas of diatomic molecules with the formula H_{2}, officially called "dihydrogen", but also called "molecular hydrogen", or simply hydrogen. Dihydrogen is a colorless, odorless, flammable gas.

==== Combustion ====
Combustion of hydrogen with the oxygen in the air. When the bottom cap is removed, allowing air to enter, hydrogen in the container rises and burns as it mixes with the air.

Hydrogen gas is highly flammable, reacting with oxygen in air to produce liquid water:

2 H_{2}(g) + O_{2}(g) → 2 H_{2}O(l)

The amount of heat released per mole of hydrogen is −286 kilojoules (kJ), or 141.9 megajoules (MJ) for a one-kilogram (2.2 lb) mass (based on the higher heating value measurement).

Hydrogen gas forms explosive mixtures with air in concentrations from 4%–74% and with chlorine at 5%–95%. The hydrogen autoignition temperature, the temperature of spontaneous ignition in air, is 500 °C (932 °F). In a high-pressure hydrogen leak, the shock wave from the leak itself can heat air to the autoignition temperature, leading to flaming and possibly explosion.

Hydrogen flames emit faint blue and ultraviolet light. Flame detectors are used to detect hydrogen fires as they are nearly invisible to the naked eye in daylight.

==== Spin isomers ====
Molecular H_{2} exists as two nuclear isomers that differ in the spin states of their nuclei. In the orthohydrogen form, the spins of the two nuclei are parallel, forming a spin triplet state having a total molecular spin $S = 1$; in the parahydrogen form the spins are antiparallel and form a spin singlet state having spin $S = 0$. The equilibrium ratio of ortho- to para-hydrogen depends on temperature. At room temperature or warmer, equilibrium hydrogen gas contains about 25% of the para form and 75% of the ortho form. The ortho form is an excited state, having higher energy than the para form by 1.455 kJ/mol, and it converts to the para form over the course of several minutes when cooled to low temperature. The thermal properties of these isomers differ because each has distinct rotational quantum states.

The ortho-to-para ratio in H_{2} is an important consideration in the liquefaction and storage of liquid hydrogen: the conversion from ortho to para is exothermic, and produces sufficient heat to evaporate most of the liquid if the conversion to parahydrogen does not occur during the cooling process. Catalysts for the ortho-para interconversion, such as ferric oxide and activated carbon compounds, are therefore used during hydrogen cooling to avoid this loss of liquid.

==== Phases ====
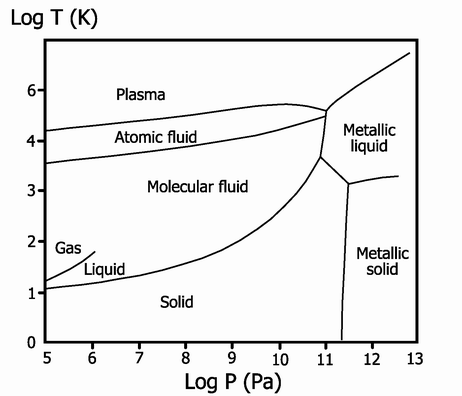
Phase diagram of hydrogen with a logarithmic scale. The left edge corresponds to about one atmosphere.

Liquid hydrogen can exist at temperatures below hydrogen's critical point of 33 kelvins (−240.2 °C; −400.3 °F). However, for it to be in a fully liquid state at atmospheric pressure, H_{2} needs to be cooled to 20.28 K (−252.87 °C; −423.17 °F). Hydrogen was liquefied by James Dewar in 1898 by using regenerative cooling and his invention, the vacuum flask.

Liquid hydrogen becomes solid hydrogen at standard pressure below hydrogen's melting point of 14.01 K (−259.14 °C; −434.45 °F). Distinct solid phases exist, known as Phase I through Phase V, each exhibiting a characteristic molecular arrangement. Liquid and solid phases can exist in combination at the triple point; this mixture is known as slush hydrogen.

Metallic hydrogen, a phase obtained at extremely high pressures (in excess of 400 billion Pa (58,000,000 psi)), is an electrical conductor. It is believed to exist deep within giant planets like Jupiter.

When ionized, hydrogen becomes a plasma. This is the form in which hydrogen exists within stars.

==== Thermal and physical properties ====
Thermal and physical properties of hydrogen (H_{2}) at atmospheric pressure
Temperature (K)	Density (kg/m^{3})	Specific heat (kJ/kg K)	Dynamic viscosity (kg/m s)	Kinematic viscosity (m^{2}/s)	Thermal conductivity (W/m K)	Thermal diffusivity (m^{2}/s)	Prandtl Number
100	0.24255	11.23	4.21E-06	1.74E-05	6.70E-02	2.46E-05	0.707
150	0.16371	12.602	5.60E-06	3.42E-05	0.0981	4.75E-05	0.718
200	0.1227	13.54	6.81E-06	5.55E-05	0.1282	7.72E-05	0.719
250	0.09819	14.059	7.92E-06	8.06E-05	0.1561	1.13E-04	0.713
300	0.08185	14.314	8.96E-06	1.10E-04	0.182	1.55E-04	0.706
350	0.07016	14.436	9.95E-06	1.42E-04	0.206	2.03E-04	0.697
400	0.06135	14.491	1.09E-05	1.77E-04	0.228	2.57E-04	0.69
450	0.05462	14.499	1.18E-05	2.16E-04	0.251	3.16E-04	0.682
500	0.04918	14.507	1.26E-05	2.57E-04	0.272	3.82E-04	0.675
550	0.04469	14.532	1.35E-05	3.02E-04	0.292	4.52E-04	0.668
600	0.04085	14.537	1.43E-05	3.50E-04	0.315	5.31E-04	0.664
700	0.03492	14.574	1.59E-05	4.55E-04	0.351	6.90E-04	0.659
800	0.0306	14.675	1.74E-05	5.69E-04	0.384	8.56E-04	0.664
900	0.02723	14.821	1.88E-05	6.90E-04	0.412	1.02E-03	0.676
1000	0.02424	14.99	2.01E-05	8.30E-04	0.448	1.23E-03	0.673
1100	0.02204	15.17	2.13E-05	9.66E-04	0.488	1.46E-03	0.662
1200	0.0202	15.37	2.26E-05	1.12E-03	0.528	1.70E-03	0.659
1300	0.01865	15.59	2.39E-05	1.28E-03	0.568	1.96E-03	0.655
1400	0.01732	15.81	2.51E-05	1.45E-03	0.61	2.23E-03	0.65
1500	0.01616	16.02	2.63E-05	1.63E-03	0.655	2.53E-03	0.643
1600	0.0152	16.28	2.74E-05	1.80E-03	0.697	2.82E-03	0.639
1700	0.0143	16.58	2.85E-05	1.99E-03	0.742	3.13E-03	0.637
1800	0.0135	16.96	2.96E-05	2.19E-03	0.786	3.44E-03	0.639
1900	0.0128	17.49	3.07E-05	2.40E-03	0.835	3.73E-03	0.643
2000	0.0121	18.25	3.18E-05	2.63E-03	0.878	3.98E-03	0.661

== History ==
=== 17th century ===
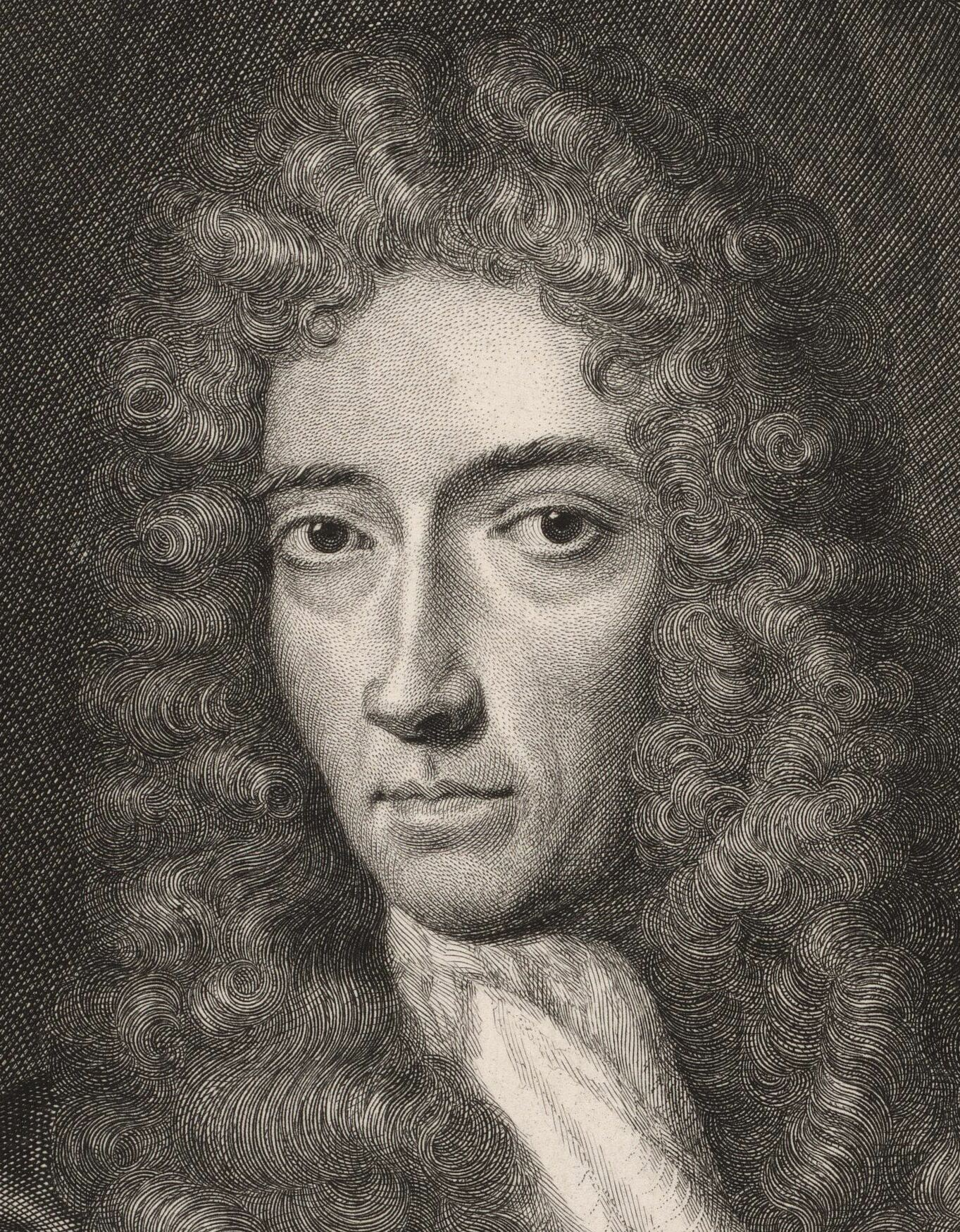
Robert Boyle, who discovered the reaction between iron filings and dilute acids

In 1671, Irish scientist Robert Boyle discovered and described the reaction between iron filings and dilute acids, which results in the production of hydrogen gas. Boyle did not note that the gas was flammable, but hydrogen would play a key role in overturning the phlogiston theory of combustion.

=== 18th century ===
In 1766, Henry Cavendish was the first to recognize hydrogen gas as a discrete substance, by naming the gas from a metal-acid reaction "inflammable air". He speculated that "inflammable air" was in fact identical to the hypothetical substance "phlogiston" and further finding in 1781 that the gas produces water when burned. He is usually given credit for the discovery of hydrogen as an element.

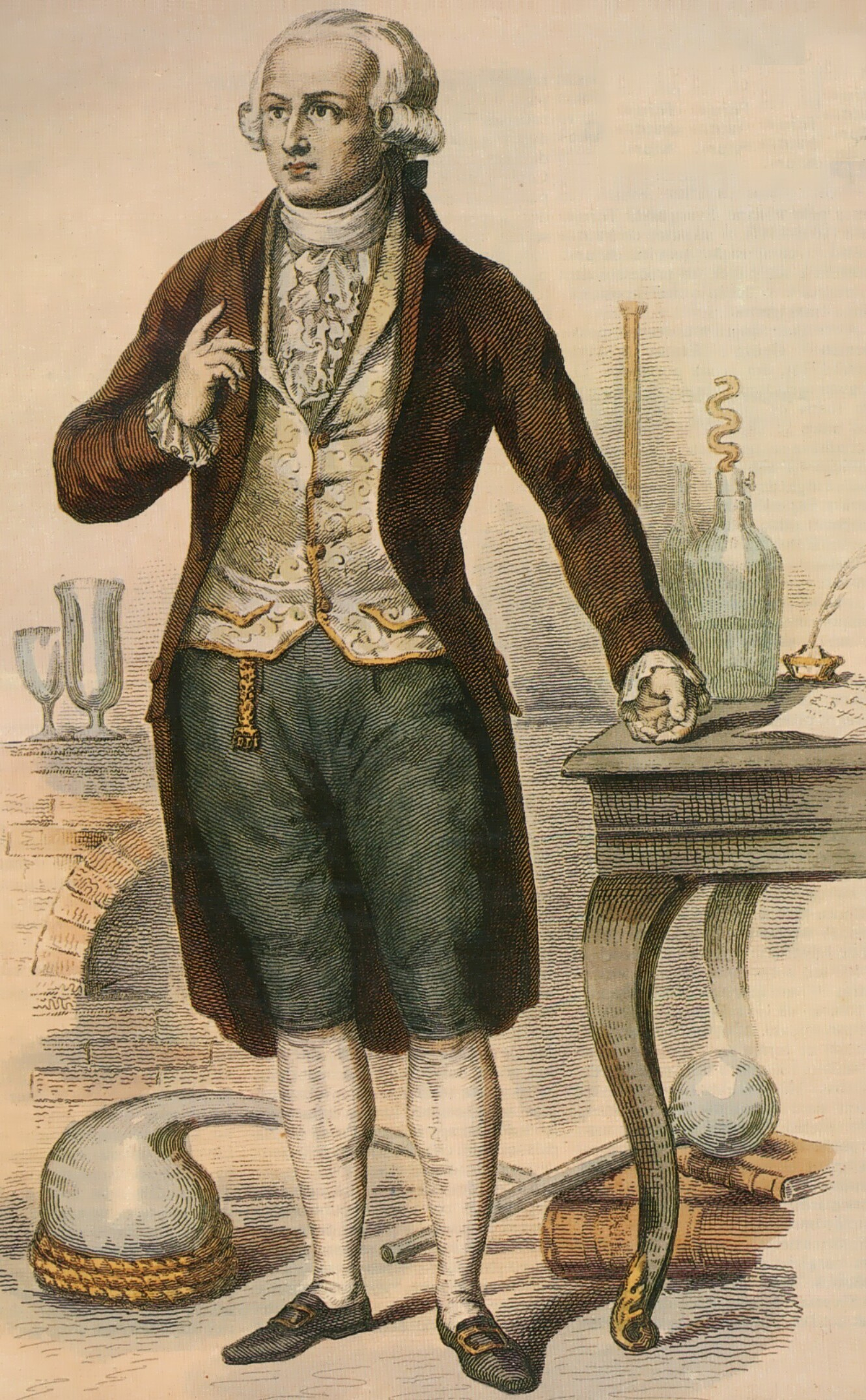
Antoine Lavoisier, who identified the element that came to be known as hydrogen

In 1783, Antoine Lavoisier identified the element that came to be known as hydrogen when he and Laplace reproduced Cavendish's finding that water is produced when hydrogen is burned. Lavoisier produced hydrogen for his experiments on mass conservation by treating metallic iron with a stream of water through an incandescent iron tube heated in a fire. Anaerobic oxidation of iron by the protons of water at high temperature can be schematically represented by the set of following reactions:

- Fe + H_{2}O → FeO + H_{2}
- 2 Fe + 3 H_{2}O → Fe_{2}O_{3} + 3 H_{2}
- 3 Fe + 4 H_{2}O → Fe_{3}O_{4} + 4 H_{2}

Many metals react similarly with water, leading to the production of hydrogen. In some situations, this H_{2}-producing process is problematic, for instance in the case of zirconium cladding on nuclear fuel rods.

=== 19th century ===
By 1806 hydrogen was used to fill balloons. François Isaac de Rivaz built the first de Rivaz engine, an internal combustion engine powered by a mixture of hydrogen and oxygen, in 1806. Edward Daniel Clarke invented the hydrogen gas blowpipe in 1819. The Döbereiner's lamp and limelight were invented in 1823. Hydrogen was liquefied for the first time by James Dewar in 1898 by using regenerative cooling and his invention, the vacuum flask. He produced solid hydrogen the next year.

One of the first quantum effects to be explicitly noticed, although not understood at the time, was James Clerk Maxwell's observation that the specific heat capacity of H_{2} unaccountably departs from that of a diatomic gas below room temperature, and begins to increasingly resemble that of a monatomic gas at cryogenic temperatures. According to quantum theory, this behavior arises from the spacing of the (quantized) rotational energy levels, which are particularly wide-spaced in H_{2} because of its low mass. These widely-spaced levels inhibit equal partition of heat energy into rotational motion in hydrogen at low temperatures. Diatomic gases composed of heavier atoms do not have such widely spaced levels and do not exhibit the same effect.

=== 20th century ===
The existence of the hydride anion was suggested by Gilbert N. Lewis in 1916 for group 1 and group 2 salt-like compounds. In 1920, Moers electrolyzed molten lithium hydride (LiH), producing a stoichiometric quantity of hydrogen at the anode.

Hydrogen emission spectrum lines in the four visible lines of the Balmer series

Because of its simple atomic structure, consisting only of a proton and an electron, the hydrogen atom, together with the spectrum of light produced from it or absorbed by it, has been central to the development of the theory of atomic structure. The energy levels of hydrogen can be calculated fairly accurately using the Bohr model of the atom, in which the electron "orbits" the proton, just as Earth orbits the Sun. However, the electron and proton are held together by electrostatic attraction, while planets and celestial objects are held by gravity. Due to the discretization of angular momentum postulated in early quantum mechanics by Bohr, the electron in the Bohr model can only occupy certain allowed distances from the proton, and therefore only certain allowed energies.

Hydrogen's unique position as the only neutral atom for which the Schrödinger equation can be directly solved has significantly contributed to the understanding of quantum mechanics through the exploration of its energetics. Furthermore, study of the corresponding simplicity of the hydrogen molecule and the corresponding cation, H^{+}_{2}, brought understanding of the nature of the chemical bond, which followed shortly after the quantum mechanical treatment of the hydrogen atom had been developed in the mid-1920s.

==== Hydrogen-lifted airship ====
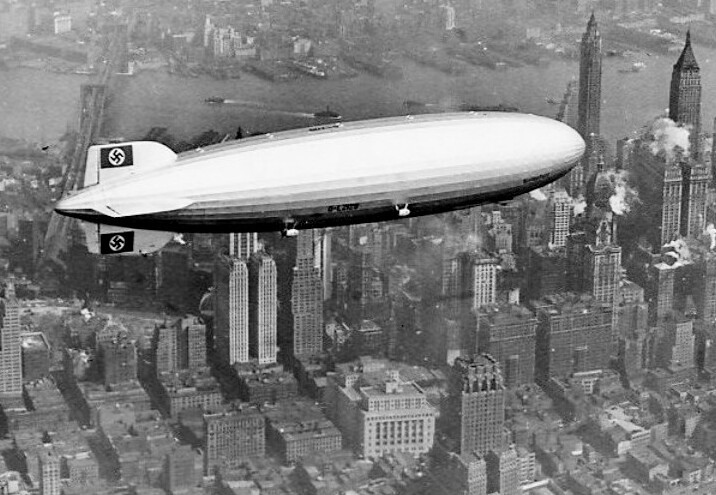
The Hindenburg over New York City in 1937

Because H_{2} has only 7% the density of air, it was once widely used as a lifting gas in balloons and airships. The first hydrogen-filled balloon was invented by Jacques Charles in 1783. Hydrogen provided the lift for the first reliable form of air-travel following the 1852 invention of the first hydrogen-lifted airship by Henri Giffard. German count Ferdinand von Zeppelin promoted the idea of rigid airships lifted by hydrogen that later were called Zeppelins, the first of which had its maiden flight in 1900. Regularly-scheduled flights started in 1910 and by the outbreak of World War I in August 1914, they had carried 35,000 passengers without a serious incident. Hydrogen-lifted airships in the form of blimps were used as observation platforms and bombers during World War II, especially on the US Eastern seaboard.

The first non-stop transatlantic crossing was made by the British airship R34 in 1919 and regular passenger service resumed in the 1920s. Hydrogen was used in the Hindenburg, which caught fire over New Jersey on 6 May 1937. The hydrogen that filled the airship was ignited, possibly by static electricity, and burst into flames. Following this disaster, commercial hydrogen airship travel ceased. Hydrogen is still used, in preference to non-flammable but more expensive helium, as a lifting gas for weather balloons.

==== Deuterium and tritium ====
Deuterium was discovered in December 1931 by Harold Urey, and tritium was prepared in 1934 by Ernest Rutherford, Mark Oliphant, and Paul Harteck. Heavy water, which consists of deuterium in the place of regular hydrogen, was discovered by Urey's group in 1932.

== Chemistry ==
=== Reactions of H_{2} ===
A dihydrogen complex of iron, [HFe(H_{2})(dppe)_{2}]^{+}

H_{2} is relatively unreactive. The thermodynamic basis of this low reactivity is the very strong H–H bond, with a bond dissociation energy of 435.7 kJ/mol. It does form coordination complexes called dihydrogen complexes. These species provide insights into the early steps in the interactions of hydrogen with metal catalysts. According to neutron diffraction, the metal and two H atoms form a triangle in these complexes. The H-H bond remains intact but is elongated. They are acidic.

Although exotic on Earth, the H^{+}_{3} ion is common in the universe. It is a triangular species, like the aforementioned dihydrogen complexes. It is known as protonated molecular hydrogen or the trihydrogen cation.

Hydrogen reacts with chlorine to produce HCl, and with bromine to produce HBr, via a chain reaction. The reaction requires initiation. For example, in the case of Br_{2}, the dibromine molecule is split apart: Br_{2} + (UV light) → 2Br•. Propagating reactions consume hydrogen molecules and produce HBr, as well as Br and H atoms:

Br• + H_{2} → HBr + H
H + Br_{2} → HBr +Br

Finally the terminating reaction:

H + HBr → H_{2} + Br•
2 Br• → Br_{2}

consumes the remaining atoms.

The addition of H_{2} to unsaturated organic compounds, such as alkenes and alkynes, is called hydrogenation. Even if the reaction is energetically favorable, it does not occur spontaneously even at higher temperatures. In the presence of a catalyst like finely divided platinum or nickel, the reaction proceeds at room temperature.

=== Hydrogen-containing compounds ===
Hydrogen can exist in both +1 and −1 oxidation states, forming compounds through ionic and covalent bonding. The element is part of a wide range of substances, including water, hydrocarbons, and numerous other organic compounds. The H^{+} ion—commonly referred to as a proton due to its single proton and absence of electrons—is central to acid–base chemistry, although the proton does not move freely. In the Brønsted–Lowry framework, acids are defined by their ability to donate H^{+} ions to bases.

Hydrogen forms a vast variety of compounds with carbon, known as hydrocarbons, and an even greater diversity with other elements (heteroatoms), giving rise to the broad class of organic compounds often associated with living organisms.

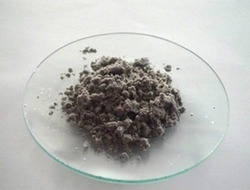
A sample of sodium hydride

Hydrogen compounds with hydrogen in the oxidation state −1 are known as hydrides, which are usually formed between hydrogen and metals. The hydrides can be ionic (aka saline), covalent, or metallic. With heating, H_{2} reacts efficiently with the alkali and alkaline earth metals to give the ionic hydrides of the formulas MH and MH_{2}, respectively. These salt-like crystalline compounds have high melting points and all react with water to liberate hydrogen. Covalent hydrides include boranes and polymeric aluminium hydride. Transition metals form metal hydrides via continuous dissolution of hydrogen into the metal. A well-known hydride is lithium aluminium hydride: the [AlH_{4}]^{−} anion carries hydridic centers firmly attached to the Al(III). Perhaps the most extensive series of hydrides are the boranes, compounds consisting only of boron and hydrogen.

Hydrides can bond to these electropositive elements not only as a terminal ligand but also as bridging ligands. In diborane (B_{2}H_{6}), four hydrogen atoms are terminal, while two bridge between the two boron atoms.

=== Hydrogen bonding ===
When bonded to a more electronegative element, particularly fluorine, oxygen, or nitrogen, hydrogen can participate in a form of medium-strength noncovalent bonding with another electronegative element with a lone pair like oxygen or nitrogen. This phenomenon, called hydrogen bonding, is critical to the stability of many biological molecules. Hydrogen bonding alters molecule structures, viscosity, solubility, melting and boiling points, and even protein folding dynamics.

=== Protons and acids ===
An "A-T base pair" in DNA illustrating how hydrogen bonds are critical to the genetic code. The drawing illustrates that in many chemical depictions, C-H bonds are not always shown explicitly, an indication of their pervasiveness.

In water, hydrogen bonding plays an important role in reaction thermodynamics. A hydrogen bond can shift over to proton transfer. Under the Brønsted–Lowry acid–base theory, acids are proton donors, while bases are proton acceptors. A bare proton (H^{+}) essentially cannot exist in anything other than a vacuum. Otherwise it attaches to other atoms, ions, or molecules. Even chemical species as inert as methane can be protonated. The term "proton" is used loosely and metaphorically to refer to solvated hydrogen cations attached to other chemical species; it is denoted "H^{+}" without any implication that any single protons exist freely in solution as a species. To avoid the implication of the naked proton in solution, acidic aqueous solutions are sometimes considered to contain the "hydronium ion" ([H_{3}O]^{+}), or still more accurately, [H_{9}O_{4}]^{+}. Other oxonium ions are found when water is in acidic solution with other solvents.

The concentration of these solvated protons determines the pH of a solution, a logarithmic scale that reflects its acidity or basicity. Lower pH values indicate higher concentrations of hydronium ions, corresponding to more acidic conditions.

== Occurrence ==
=== Cosmic ===
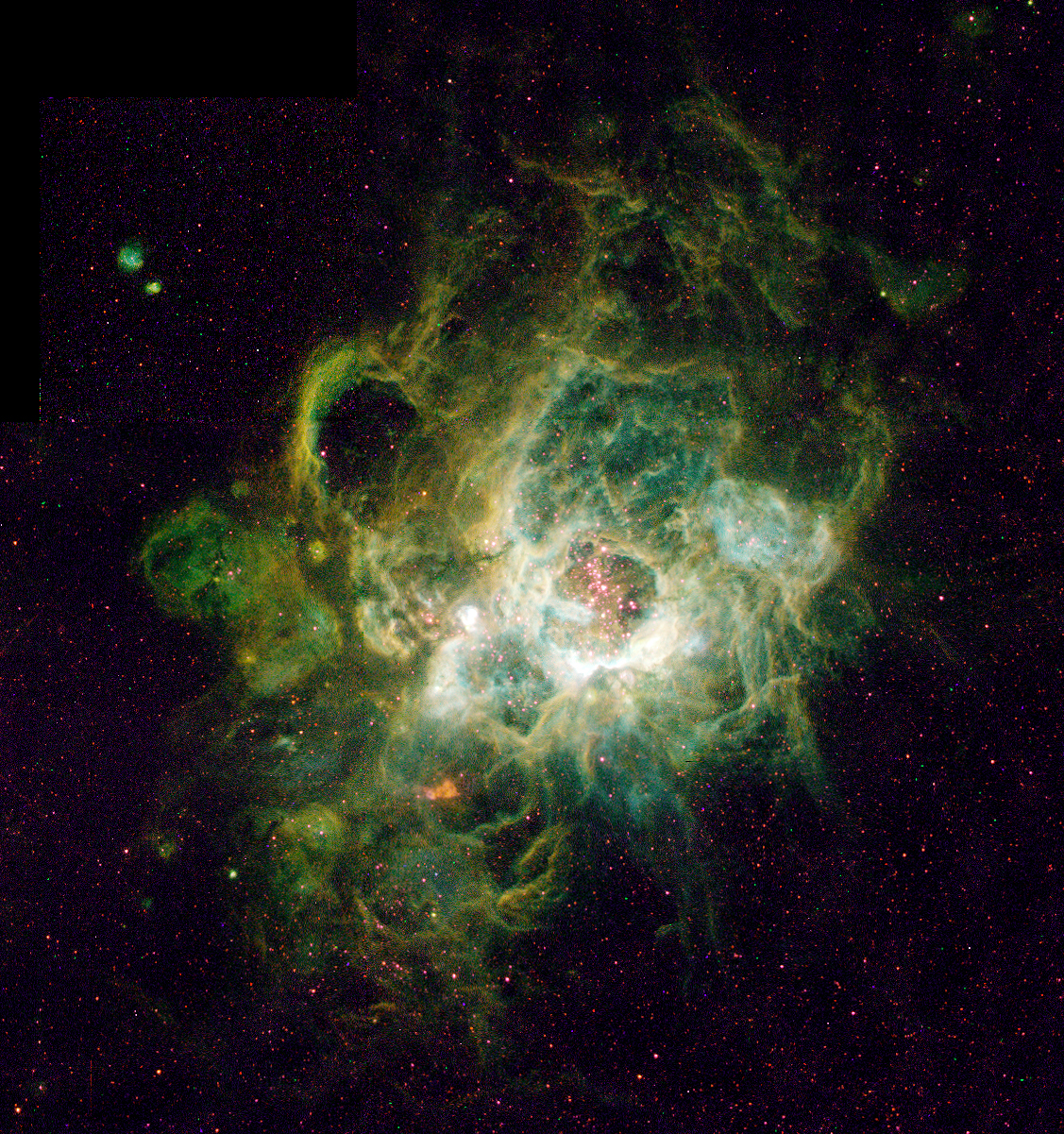
NGC 604, a giant region of ionized hydrogen in the Triangulum Galaxy

Hydrogen, as atomic H, is the most abundant chemical element in the universe, making up 75% of normal matter by mass. and >90% by number of atoms. In the early universe, protons formed in the first second after the Big Bang; neutral hydrogen atoms formed about 370,000 years later during the recombination epoch as the universe expanded and plasma had cooled enough for electrons to remain bound to protons.

In astrophysics, neutral hydrogen in the interstellar medium is called H I and ionized hydrogen is called H II. Radiation from stars ionizes H I to H II, creating spheres of ionized H II around stars. In the chronology of the universe neutral hydrogen dominated until the birth of stars during the era of reionization, which then produced bubbles of ionized hydrogen that grew and merged over hundreds of millions of years. These are the source of the 21-centimeter hydrogen line, at 1420 MHz, that is detected in order to probe primordial hydrogen. The large amount of neutral hydrogen found in the damped Lyman-alpha systems is thought to dominate the cosmological baryonic density of the universe up to a redshift of z = 4.

Hydrogen is found in great abundance in stars and gas giant planets. Molecular clouds of H_{2} are associated with star formation. Hydrogen plays a vital role in powering stars through the proton-proton reaction in lower-mass stars, and through the CNO cycle of nuclear fusion in stars more massive than the Sun.

Protonated molecular hydrogen (H^{+}_{3}) is found in the interstellar medium, where it is generated by ionization of molecular hydrogen by cosmic rays. This ion has also been observed in the upper atmosphere of Jupiter. The ion is long-lived in outer space due to the low temperature and density. H^{+}_{3} is one of the most abundant ions in the universe, and it plays a notable role in the chemistry of the interstellar medium. Neutral triatomic hydrogen H_{3} can exist only in an excited form and is unstable.

=== Terrestrial ===
Hydrogen is the third most abundant element on the Earth's surface, mostly existing within chemical compounds such as hydrocarbons and water. Elemental hydrogen is normally in the form of a gas, H_{2}, at standard conditions. It is present in a very low concentration in Earth's atmosphere (around 0.53 parts per million on a molar basis) because of its light weight, which enables it to escape the atmosphere more rapidly than heavier gases. Despite its low concentration in the atmosphere, terrestrial hydrogen is sufficiently abundant to support the metabolism of several varieties of bacteria.

Large underground deposits of hydrogen gas have been discovered in several countries including Mali, France and Australia. During 2024, it was uncertain how much underground hydrogen can be extracted economically. In 2026, discussion of the potential renewed.

== Production and storage ==
=== Industrial routes ===
Nearly all of the world's current supply of hydrogen gas (H_{2}) is produced from fossil fuels, with less than 1% of hydrogen being produced by low-emissions technologies in 2025. Many methods exist for producing H_{2}, but three dominate commercially: steam reforming often coupled to water-gas shift, partial oxidation of hydrocarbons, and water electrolysis.

==== Steam reforming ====
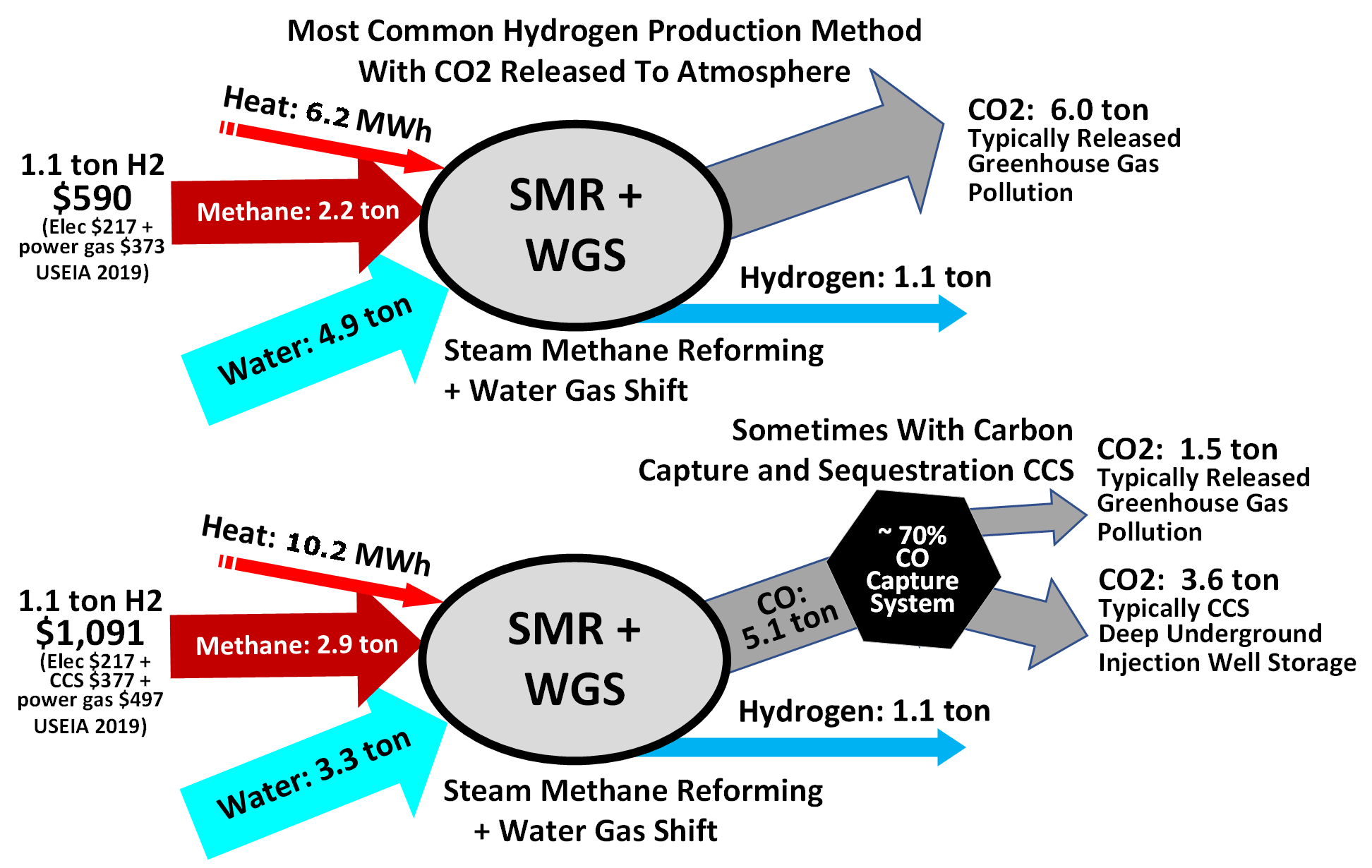
Inputs and outputs of steam reforming (SMR) and water gas shift (WGS) reaction of natural gas, a process used in hydrogen production

Hydrogen is mainly produced by steam methane reforming (SMR), the reaction of water and methane. Thus, at high temperature (1,000–1,400 K [730–1,130 °C; 1,340–2,060 °F]), steam (water vapor) reacts with methane to yield carbon monoxide and H_{2}.

CH_{4} + H_{2}O → CO + 3 H_{2}

Producing one tonne of hydrogen through this process emits 6.6–9.3 tonnes of carbon dioxide. The production of natural gas feedstock also produces emissions such as vented and fugitive methane, which further contributes to the overall carbon footprint of hydrogen.

This reaction is favored at low pressures but is nonetheless conducted at high pressures (2.0 MPa [20 atm; 590 inHg]) because high-pressure H_{2} is the most marketable product, and pressure swing adsorption (PSA) purification systems work better at higher pressures. The product mixture is known as "synthesis gas" because it is often used directly for the production of methanol and many other compounds. Hydrocarbons other than methane can be used to produce synthesis gas with varying product ratios. One of the many complications to this highly-optimized technology is the formation of coke or carbon:

CH_{4} → C + 2 H_{2}

Therefore, steam reforming typically employs an excess of H_{2}O. Additional hydrogen can be recovered from the steam by using carbon monoxide through the water gas shift reaction (WGS). This process requires an iron oxide catalyst:

CO + H_{2}O → CO_{2} + H_{2}

Hydrogen is sometimes produced and consumed in the same industrial process, without being separated. In the Haber process for ammonia production, hydrogen is generated from natural gas.

==== Partial oxidation of hydrocarbons ====
Other methods for CO and H_{2} production include partial oxidation of hydrocarbons:

2 CH_{4} + O_{2} → 2 CO + 4 H_{2}

Although less important commercially, coal can serve as a prelude to the above shift reaction:

C + H_{2}O → CO + H_{2}

Olefin production units may produce substantial quantities of byproduct hydrogen, particularly from cracking light feedstocks like ethane or propane.

==== Water electrolysis ====
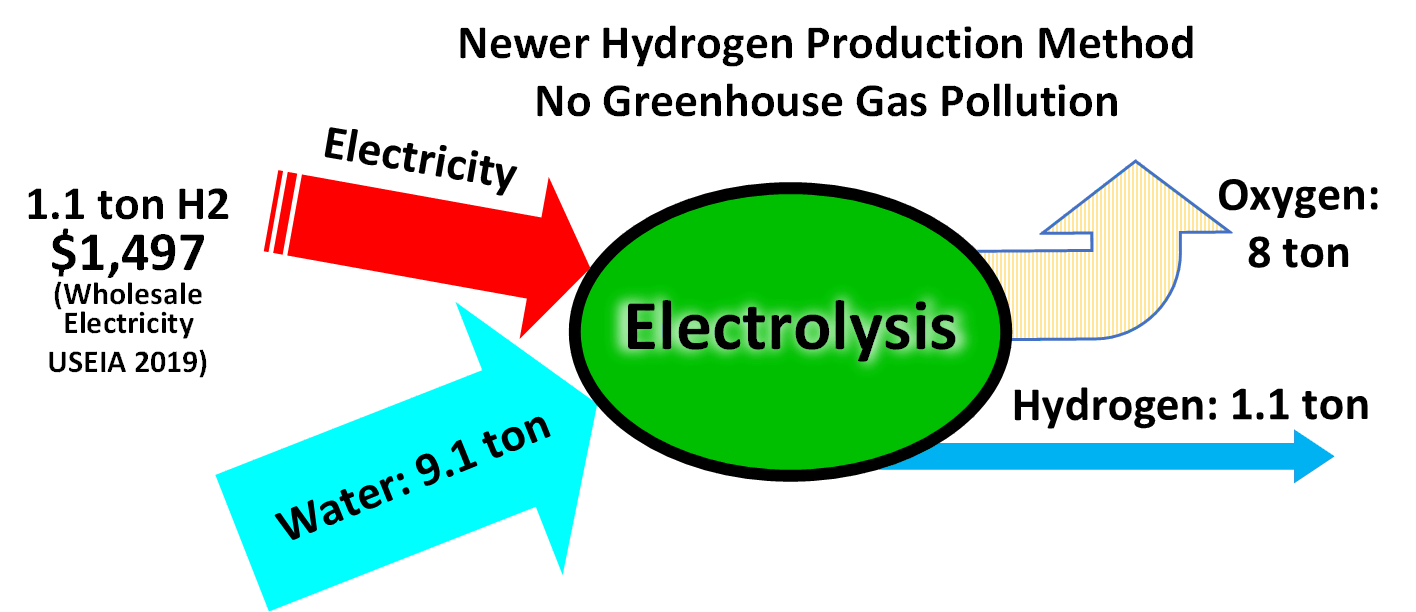
Inputs and outputs of the electrolysis of water production of hydrogen

Electrolysis of water is a conceptually simple method of producing hydrogen.

2 H_{2}O(l) → 2 H_{2}(g) + O_{2}(g)

Commercial electrolyzers use nickel-based catalysts in strongly alkaline solution. Platinum is a better catalyst but is expensive. The hydrogen created through electrolysis using renewable energy is commonly referred to as "green hydrogen".

Electrolysis of brine to yield chlorine also produces high-purity hydrogen as a co-product, which is used for a variety of transformations such as hydrogenations.

The electrolysis process is more expensive than producing hydrogen from methane without carbon capture and storage.

Innovation in hydrogen electrolyzers could make large-scale production of hydrogen from electricity more cost-competitive.

==== Methane pyrolysis ====
Hydrogen can be produced by pyrolysis of natural gas (methane), producing hydrogen gas and solid carbon with the aid of a catalyst and 74 kJ/mol input heat:

CH_{4}(g) → C(s) + 2 H_{2}(g) (ΔH° = 74 kJ/mol)

The carbon may be sold as a manufacturing feedstock or fuel, or landfilled. This route could have a lower carbon footprint than existing hydrogen production processes, but mechanisms for removing the carbon and preventing it from reacting with the catalyst remain obstacles for industrial-scale use.

==== Thermochemical ====
Water splitting is the process by which water is decomposed into its components. Relevant to the biological scenario is this equation:

2 H_{2}O → 4 H^{+} + O_{2} + 4 e^{−}

The reaction occurs in the light-dependent reactions in all photosynthetic organisms. A few organisms, including the alga Chlamydomonas reinhardtii and cyanobacteria, have evolved a second step in the dark reactions in which protons and electrons are reduced to form H_{2} gas by specialized hydrogenases in the chloroplast.

Efforts have been undertaken to genetically modify cyanobacterial hydrogenases to more efficiently generate H_{2} gas even in the presence of oxygen. Efforts have also been undertaken with genetically‐modified alga in a bioreactor.

Relevant to the thermal water-splitting scenario is this simple equation:

2 H_{2}O → 2 H_{2} + O_{2}

Over 200 thermochemical cycles can be used for water splitting. Many of these cycles such as the iron oxide cycle, cerium(IV) oxide–cerium(III) oxide cycle, zinc–zinc oxide cycle, sulfur–iodine cycle, copper–chlorine cycle and hybrid sulfur cycle have been evaluated for their commercial potential to produce hydrogen and oxygen from water and heat without using electricity. A number of labs (including in France, Germany, Greece, Japan, and the United States) are developing thermochemical methods to produce hydrogen from solar energy and water.

=== Natural routes ===
==== Biohydrogen ====
H_{2} is produced in organisms by enzymes called hydrogenases. This process allows the host organism to use fermentation as a source of energy. These same enzymes also can oxidize H_{2}, such that the host organisms can subsist by reducing oxidized substrates using electrons extracted from H_{2}.

Hydrogenase enzymes feature iron or iron–nickel centers at their active sites. The natural cycle of hydrogen production and consumption by organisms is called the hydrogen cycle.

Some bacteria such as Mycobacterium smegmatis can use the small amount of hydrogen in the atmosphere as a source of energy when other sources are lacking. Their hydrogenases feature small channels that exclude oxygen from the active site, permitting the reaction to occur even though the hydrogen concentration is very low and the oxygen concentration is as in normal air.

Confirming the existence of hydrogenase‐employing microbes in the human gut, H_{2} occurs in human breath. The concentration in the breath of fasting people at rest is typically under 5 parts per million (ppm), but can reach 50 ppm when people with intestinal disorders consume molecules they cannot absorb during diagnostic hydrogen breath tests.

==== Serpentinization ====
Serpentinization is a geological mechanism which produces highly-reducing conditions. Under these conditions, water is capable of oxidizing ferrous (Fe^{2+}) ions in fayalite, generating hydrogen gas:

Fe_{2}SiO_{4} + H_{2}O → 2 Fe_{3}O_{4} + SiO_{2} + H_{2}

Closely related to this geological process is the Schikorr reaction:

3 Fe(OH)_{2} → Fe_{3}O_{4} + 2 H_{2}O + H_{2}

This process also is relevant to the corrosion of iron and steel in oxygen-free groundwater and in reducing soils below the water table.

=== Laboratory syntheses ===
H_{2} is produced in laboratory settings, such as in the small-scale electrolysis of water using metal electrodes and water containing an electrolyte, which liberates hydrogen gas at the cathode:

2H^{+}(aq) + 2 e^{−} → H_{2}(g)

Hydrogen is also often a by-product of other reactions. Many metals react with water to produce H_{2}, but the rate of hydrogen evolution depends on the metal, the pH, and the presence of alloying agents. Most often, hydrogen evolution is induced by acids. The alkali and alkaline earth metals as well as aluminium, zinc, manganese, and iron, react readily with aqueous acids.

Zn + 2 H^{+} → Zn^{2+} + H_{2}

Many metals, such as aluminium, are slow to react with water because they form passivated oxide coatings. An alloy of aluminium and gallium, however, does react with water. In high-pH solutions, aluminium can react with H_{2}:

2 Al + 6 H_{2}O + 2 OH^{−} → 2 [Al(OH)_{4}]^{−} + 3 H_{2}

=== Storage ===
If H_{2} is to be used as an energy source, its storage is important. It dissolves only poorly in solvents. For example, at room temperature and 0.1 millipascals (9.9×10^{−10} atm), approx. 0.05 moles of hydrogen dissolve into one kilogram (2.2 lb) of diethyl ether. H_{2} can be stored in compressed form, although compressing costs energy. Liquefaction is impractical given hydrogen's low critical temperature. In contrast, ammonia and many hydrocarbons can be liquified at room temperature under pressure. For these reasons, hydrogen carriers—materials that reversibly bind H_{2}—have attracted much attention. The key question is then the weight percent of H_{2}-equivalents within the carrier material. For example, hydrogen can be reversibly absorbed into many rare earths and transition metals and is soluble in both nanocrystalline and amorphous metals. Hydrogen solubility in metals is influenced by local distortions or impurities in the crystal lattice. These properties may be useful when hydrogen is purified by passage through hot palladium disks, but the gas's high solubility is also a metallurgical problem, contributing to the embrittlement of many metals, complicating the design of pipelines and storage tanks.

The most problematic aspect of metal hydrides for storage is their modest H_{2} content, often on the order of 1%. For this reason, there is interest in storage of H_{2} in compounds of low molecular weight. For example, ammonia borane (H_{3}N−BH_{3}) contains 19.8 weight percent of H_{2}. The problem with this material is that after release of H_{2}, the resulting boron nitride does not re-add H_{2}: i.e., ammonia borane is an irreversible hydrogen carrier. More attractive are hydrocarbons such as tetrahydroquinoline, which reversibly release some H_{2} when heated in the presence of a catalyst:

C_{9}H_{10}NH ⇌ C_{9}H_{7}N + 2 H_{2}

== Applications ==
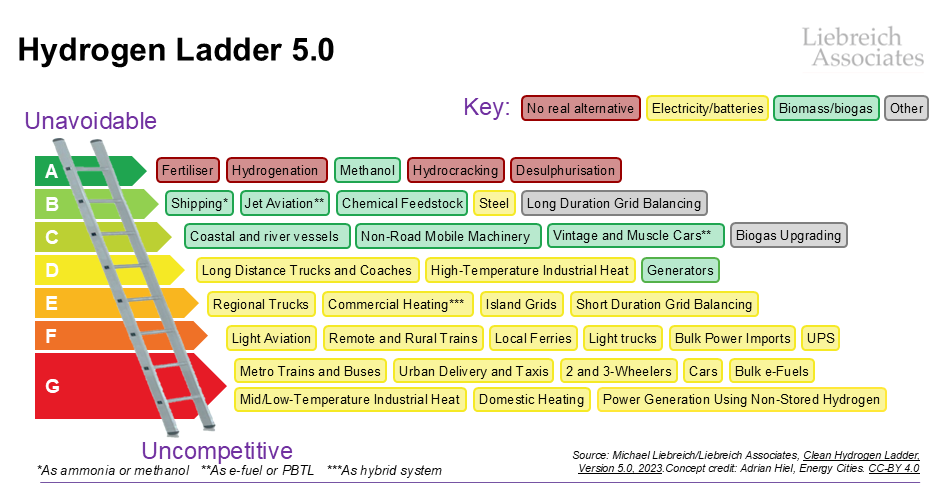
Hydrogen Ladder: Ranking of hydrogen applications and uses in the medium term, but analysts disagree

=== Petrochemical industry ===
Large quantities of H_{2} are used in the "upgrading" of fossil fuels. Key consumers of H_{2} include hydrodesulfurization and hydrocracking. Many of these reactions can be classified as hydrogenolysis, i.e., the cleavage of bonds by hydrogen. Illustrative is the separation of sulfur from liquid fossil fuels:

R_{2}S + 2 H_{2} → H_{2}S + 2 RH

=== Hydrogenation ===
Hydrogenation, the addition of H_{2} to various substrates, is done on a large scale. Hydrogenation of N_{2} produces ammonia by the Haber process:

N_{2} + 3 H_{2} → 2 NH_{3}

This process consumes a few percent of the energy budget in the entire industry and is the biggest consumer of hydrogen. The resulting ammonia is used extensively in fertilizer production; these fertilizers have become essential feedstocks in modern agriculture. Hydrogenation is also used to convert unsaturated fats and oils to saturated fats and oils. The major application is the production of margarine. Methanol is produced by hydrogenation of carbon dioxide; the mixture of hydrogen and carbon monooxide used for this process is known as syngas. H_{2} is also used as a reducing agent for the conversion of some ores to the metals.

=== Fuel ===
The potential for using hydrogen (H_{2}) as a fuel has been widely discussed. Hydrogen can be used in fuel cells to produce electricity, or burned to generate heat. When hydrogen is consumed in fuel cells, the only emission at the point of use is water vapor. When burned, hydrogen produces relatively little pollution at the point of combustion, but can lead to thermal formation of harmful nitrogen oxides.

If hydrogen is produced with low or zero greenhouse gas emissions (green hydrogen), it can play a significant role in decarbonizing energy systems where there are challenges and limitations to replacing fossil fuels with direct use of electricity.

Hydrogen fuel can produce the intense heat required for industrial production of steel, cement, glass, and chemicals, thus contributing to the decarbonization of industry alongside other technologies, such as electric arc furnaces for steelmaking. However, it is likely to play a larger role in providing industrial feedstock for cleaner production of ammonia and organic chemicals. For example, in steelmaking, hydrogen could function as a clean fuel and also as a low-carbon catalyst, replacing coal-derived coke (carbon):

2FeO + C → 2Fe + CO_{2}
vs
FeO + H_{2} → Fe + H_{2}O

Hydrogen used to decarbonize transportation is likely to find its largest applications in shipping, aviation and, to a lesser extent, heavy goods vehicles, through the use of hydrogen-derived synthetic fuels such as ammonia and methanol and fuel cell technology. For light-duty vehicles including cars, hydrogen is far behind other alternative fuel vehicles, especially compared with the rate of adoption of battery electric vehicles, and may not play a significant role in the future.

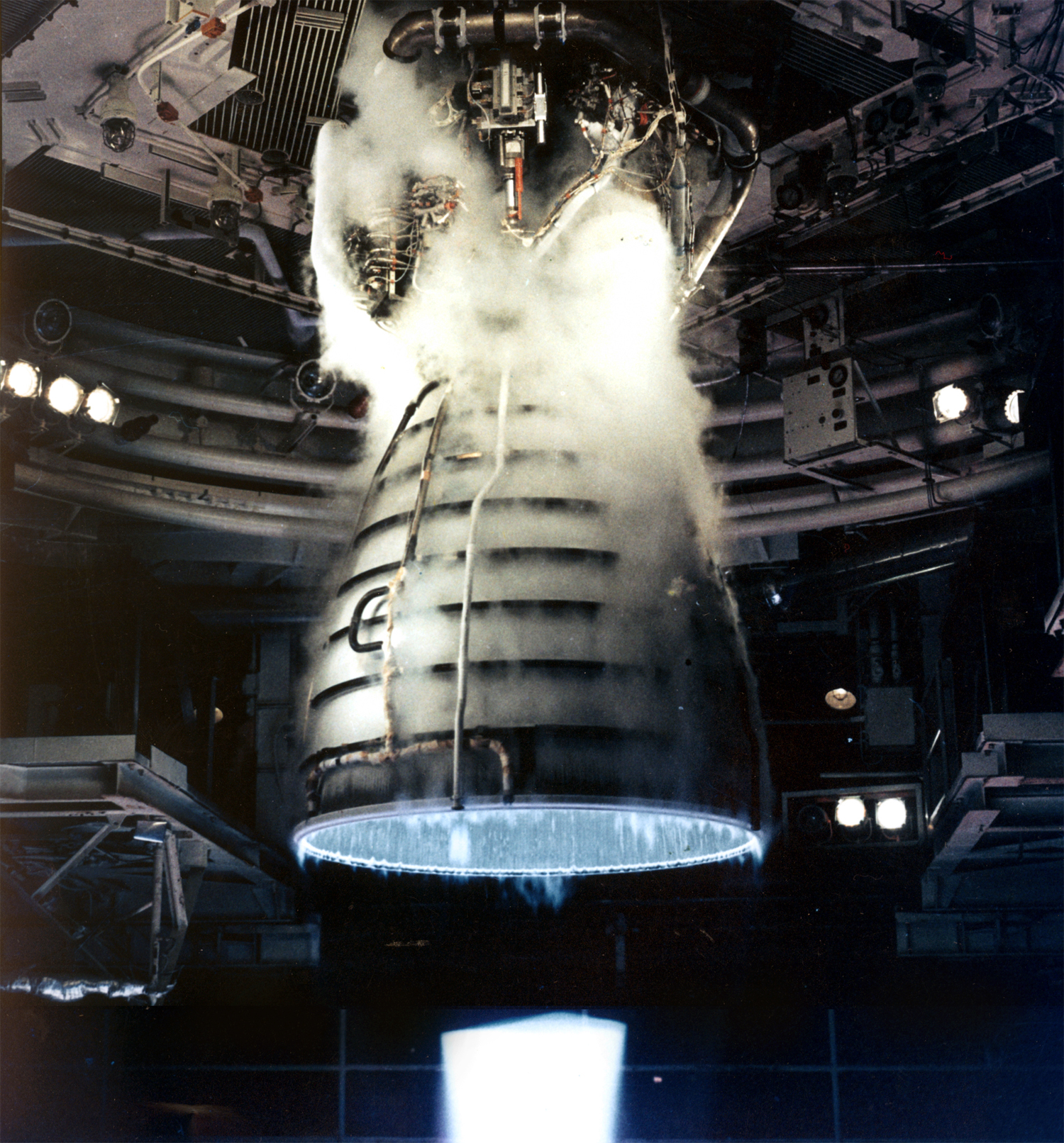
A Space Shuttle Main Engine burns hydrogen with oxygen, producing a nearly invisible flame at full thrust.

Liquid hydrogen and liquid oxygen together serve as cryogenic propellants in liquid-propellant rockets, as in the Space Shuttle main engines. NASA has investigated the use of rocket propellant made from atomic hydrogen, boron or carbon that is frozen into solid molecular hydrogen particles suspended in liquid helium. Upon warming, the mixture vaporizes to allow the atomic species to recombine, heating the mixture to high temperature.

Hydrogen produced when there is a surplus of variable renewable electricity could in principle be stored and later used to generate heat or to re-generate electricity. It can be further transformed into synthetic fuels such as ammonia and methanol. Disadvantages of hydrogen fuel include high costs of storage and distribution due to hydrogen's explosivity, its large volume compared to other fuels, and its tendency to embrittle materials. The economic disadvantage of distribution can be reduced by co-locating facilities that use hydrogen in mining industry hubs.

=== Nickel–hydrogen battery ===
The very long-lived, rechargeable nickel–hydrogen battery developed for satellite power systems uses pressurized gaseous H_{2}. The International Space Station, Mars Odyssey and the Mars Global Surveyor are equipped with nickel-hydrogen batteries. In the dark part of its orbit, the Hubble Space Telescope is also powered by nickel-hydrogen batteries, which were finally replaced in May 2009, more than 19 years after launch and 13 years beyond their design life.

=== Semiconductor industry ===
Hydrogen is employed in semiconductor manufacturing to saturate broken ("dangling") bonds of amorphous silicon and amorphous carbon, which helps in stabilizing the materials' properties. Hydrogen, introduced as an unintended side-effect of production, acts as a shallow electron donor leading to n-type conductivity in ZnO, with important uses in transducers and phosphors. Detailed analysis of ZnO and of MgO shows evidence of four and six-fold hydrogen multicentre bonds. The doping behavior of hydrogen varies with material.

=== Niche and evolving uses ===
Beyond the uses mentioned above, hydrogen is used in smaller scales in the following applications:

- Shielding gas: Hydrogen is used as a shielding gas in welding methods such as atomic hydrogen welding.
- Coolant: Hydrogen is used as a coolant in large electrical generators due to its high thermal conductivity and low density. The first hydrogen-cooled turbogenerator went into service using gaseous hydrogen as a coolant in the rotor and the stator in 1937 in Dayton, Ohio.
- Cryogenic research: Liquid H_{2} is used in cryogenic research, including superconductivity studies.
- Food industry: Hydrogen is an authorized food additive (E949) that is used as a packaging gas, and also has antioxidant properties.
- Leak detection: Pure or mixed with nitrogen (sometimes called forming gas), hydrogen is a tracer gas for detection of minute leaks. Applications can be found in the automotive, chemical, power generation, aerospace, and telecommunications industries; it is also used for leak testing in food packaging.
- Neutron moderation: Liquid deuterium (hydrogen-2) can be used as a moderator to slow neutrons used in ultra cold neutron studies.
- Nuclear fusion fuel: Deuterium is used in nuclear fusion reactions.
- Isotopic labeling: Deuterium compounds have applications in chemistry and biology in studies of isotope effects on reaction rates.
- Tritium uses: Tritium (hydrogen-3), produced in nuclear reactors, is used in the production of hydrogen bombs, as an isotopic label in the biosciences, and as a source of beta radiation in radioluminescent paint for instrument dials and emergency signage.

== Safety and precautions ==
Hydrogen
Hazards
- GHS labelling
Pictograms	(GHS02: Flammable)
Signal word	Danger
Hazard statements	H220
Precautionary statements	P202, P210, P271, P377, P381, P403
NFPA 704 (fire diamond)	0 4 0

In hydrogen pipelines and steel storage vessels, hydrogen molecules are prone to reacting with metals, causing hydrogen embrittlement and leaks in the pipeline or storage vessel. Since it is lighter than air, hydrogen does not easily accumulate to form a combustible gas mixture. However, even without ignition sources, high-pressure hydrogen leakage may cause spontaneous combustion and detonation.

Hydrogen is flammable when mixed even in small amounts with air. Ignition can occur at a volumetric ratio of hydrogen to air as low as 4%. In approximately 70% of hydrogen ignition accidents, the ignition source cannot be determined.

Hydrogen fire, while being extremely hot, is almost invisible to the human eye, and thus can lead to accidental burns. Hydrogen is non-toxic, but like most gases it can cause asphyxiation in the absence of adequate ventilation.

== See also ==
- Combined cycle hydrogen power plant
- Hydrogen economy – Using hydrogen to decarbonize more sectors
- Hydrogen production – Industrial production of molecular hydrogen
- Hydrogen safety – Procedures for safe production, handling and use of hydrogen
- Hydrogen technologies – Technologies that relating to the production & use of hydrogen
- Hydrogen transport
- Methane pyrolysis – Thermal decomposition of materials (for hydrogen)
- Natural hydrogen – Molecular hydrogen naturally occurring on Earth
- Pyrolysis – Thermal decomposition of materials
