= Hybrid sulfur cycle =

Simplified diagram of the Hybrid sulfur cycle

The hybrid sulfur cycle (HyS) is a two-step water-splitting process intended to be used for hydrogen production. Based on sulfur oxidation and reduction, it is classified as a hybrid thermochemical cycle because it uses an electrochemical (instead of a thermochemical) reaction for one of the two steps. The remaining thermochemical step is shared with the sulfur–iodine cycle.

The Hybrid sulphur cycle (HyS)was initially proposed and developed by Westinghouse Electric Corp. in the 1970s, so it is also known as the "Westinghouse" cycle. Current development efforts in the United States are being led by the Savannah River National Laboratory.

== Process description ==
The two reactions in the HyS cycle are as follows:

1. H_{2}SO_{4}_{(aq)} → H_{2}O_{(g)} + SO_{2}_{(g)} + ½ O_{2}_{(g)} (thermochemical, T > 800 °C)
2. SO_{2}_{(aq)} + 2 H_{2}O_{(l)} → H_{2}SO_{4}_{(aq)} + H_{2}_{(g)} (electrochemical, T = 80-120 °C)

Net reaction: H_{2}O_{(l)} → H_{2}_{(g)} + ½ O_{2}_{(g)}

Sulfur dioxide acts to depolarize the anode of the electrolyzer. This results in a significant decrease in the reversible cell potential (and, therefore, the electric power requirement) for reaction (2). The standard cell potential for reaction (2) is -0.158 V at 298.15 K, compared to -1.229 V for the electrolysis of water (with oxygen evolution as the anodic reaction).

== See also ==
- Cerium(IV) oxide–cerium(III) oxide cycle
- Copper–chlorine cycle
- Iron oxide cycle
- Sulfur–iodine cycle
- Zinc–zinc oxide cycle
