= Sulfur–iodine cycle =

Thermochemical process used to produce hydrogen

Schematic diagram of the sulfur–iodine cycle

The sulfur–iodine cycle (S–I cycle) is a three-step thermochemical cycle used to produce hydrogen.

The S–I cycle consists of three chemical reactions whose net reactant is water and whose net products are hydrogen and oxygen. All other chemicals are recycled. The S–I process requires an efficient source of heat.

== Process description ==
		H_{2}O				½ O_{2}
		↓				↑
I_{2}	→	Reaction 1	←	SO_{2} + H_{2}O	←	Separate
↑		↓				↑
2 HI	←	Separate	→	H_{2}SO_{4}	→	Reaction 2
↓
H_{2}

The three reactions combined to produce hydrogen are the following:

I_{2} + SO_{2} + 2 H_{2}O 2 HI + H_{2}SO_{4} (120 °C (250 °F)) (Bunsen reaction)

The HI is then separated by distillation or liquid/liquid gravitic separation.

2 H_{2}SO_{4} 2 SO_{2} + 2 H_{2}O + O_{2} (830 °C (1,530 °F))

The water, SO_{2} and residual H_{2}SO_{4} must be separated from the oxygen byproduct by condensation.

2 HI I_{2} + H_{2} (450 °C (840 °F))

Iodine and any accompanying water or SO_{2} are separated by condensation, and the hydrogen product remains as a gas.

Net reaction: 2 H_{2}O → 2 H_{2} + O_{2}

The sulfur and iodine compounds are recovered and reused, hence the consideration of the process as a cycle. This S–I process is a chemical heat engine. Heat enters the cycle in high-temperature endothermic chemical reactions 2 and 3, and heat exits the cycle in the low-temperature exothermic reaction 1. The difference between the heat entering and leaving the cycle exits the cycle in the form of the heat of combustion of the hydrogen produced.

== Characteristics ==
=== Advantages ===
- All fluid (liquids, gases) process, therefore well suited for continuous production
- High thermal efficiency predicted (about 50%)
- Completely closed system without byproducts or effluents (besides hydrogen and oxygen)
- Suitable for application with solar, nuclear, and hybrid (e.g., solar-fossil) sources of heat – if high enough temperatures can be achieved
- More developed than competing thermochemical processes
- Scalable from relatively small scale to huge applications
- No need for expensive or toxic catalysts or additives
- More efficient than electrolysis of water (~70–80% efficiency) using electricity derived from a thermal power plant (~30–60% efficiency) combining to ~21–48% efficiency
- Waste heat suitable for district heating if cogeneration is desired

=== Disadvantages ===
- Very high temperatures required (at least 850 °C (1,560 °F)) – unachievable or difficult to achieve with current pressurized water reactors or concentrated solar power
- Corrosive reagents used as intermediaries (iodine, sulfur dioxide, hydriodic acid, sulfuric acid); therefore, advanced materials needed for construction of process apparatus
- Significant further development required to be feasible on large scale
- At the proposed temperature range advanced thermal power plants can achieve efficiencies (electric output per heat input) in excess of 50% somewhat negating the efficiency advantage
- In case of leakage, corrosive and somewhat toxic hydroiodic acid is released to the environment
- If hydrogen is to be used for process heat the required high temperatures make the benefits compared to direct utilization of heat questionable
- Unable to use non-thermal or low-grade thermal energy sources such as hydropower, wind power or most currently available geothermal power

== Research ==
The S–I cycle was invented at General Atomics in the 1970s. The Japan Atomic Energy Agency (JAEA) has conducted successful experiments with the S–I cycle in the helium cooled High Temperature Test Reactor, a reactor which reached first criticality in 1998, JAEA have the aspiration of using further nuclear very high-temperature generation IV reactors (VHTR) to produce industrial scale quantities of hydrogen. (The Japanese refer to the cycle as the IS cycle.) Plans have been made to test larger-scale automated systems for hydrogen production. Under an International Nuclear Energy Research Initiative (INERI) agreement, the French CEA, General Atomics and Sandia National Laboratories are jointly developing the sulfur-iodine process. Additional research is taking place at the Idaho National Laboratory, and in Canada, Korea and Italy.

=== Material challenge ===
The S–I cycle involves operations with corrosive chemicals at temperatures up to about 1,000 °C (1,830 °F). The selection of materials with sufficient corrosion resistance under the process conditions is of key importance to the economic viability of this process. The materials suggested include the following classes: refractory metals, reactive metals, superalloys, ceramics, polymers, and coatings. Some materials suggested include tantalum alloys, niobium alloys, noble metals, high-silicon steels, several nickel-based superalloys, mullite, silicon carbide (SiC), glass, silicon nitride (Si_{3}N_{4}), and others. Recent research on scaled prototyping suggests that new tantalum surface technologies may be a technically and economically feasible way to make larger scale installations.

== Hydrogen economy ==
The sulfur-iodine cycle has been proposed as a way to supply hydrogen for a hydrogen-based economy. It does not require hydrocarbons like current methods of steam reforming but requires heat from combustion, nuclear reactions, or solar heat concentrators.

== See also ==
- Cerium(IV) oxide–cerium(III) oxide cycle
- Copper–chlorine cycle
- Hybrid sulfur cycle
- High-temperature electrolysis
- Iron oxide cycle
- Zinc–zinc oxide cycle
