= Ceria based thermochemical cycles =

A ceria based thermochemical cycle is a type of two-step thermochemical cycle that uses as oxygen carrier cerium oxides ($CeO_2$/$Ce_2O_3$) for synthetic fuel production such as hydrogen or syngas. These cycles are able to obtain either hydrogen ($H_2$) from the splitting of water molecules ($H_2O$), or also syngas, which is a mixture of hydrogen ($H_2$) and carbon monoxide ($CO$), by also splitting carbon dioxide ($CO_2$) molecules alongside water molecules. These types of thermochemical cycles are mainly studied for concentrated solar applications.

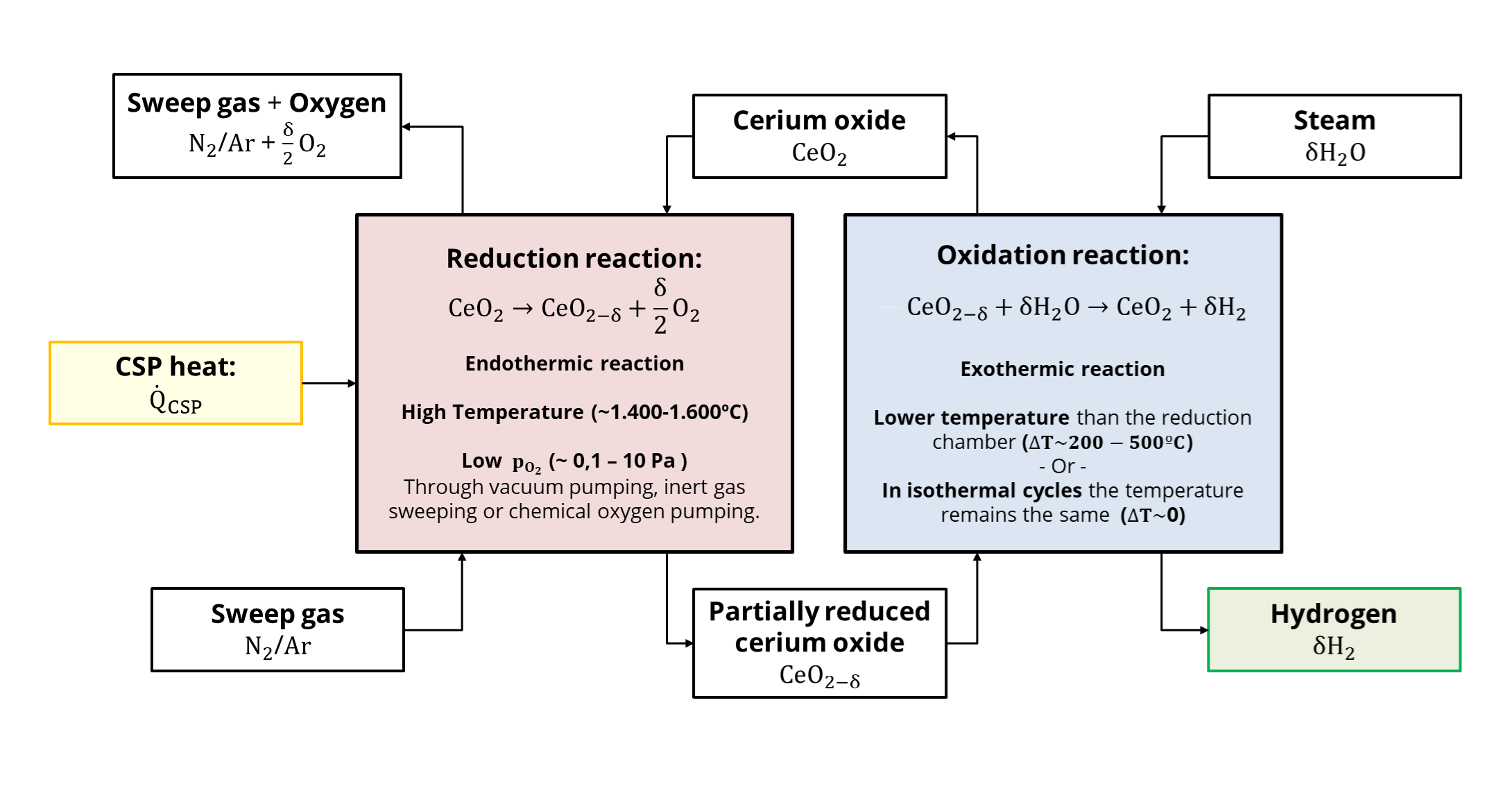
Basic non-stoichiometric ceria cycle scheme. The sweep gas can be substituted by a vacuum pump.

== Types of cycles ==
These cycles are based on the two step redox thermochemical cycle. In the first step, a metal oxide, such as ceria, is reduced by providing heat to the material, liberating oxygen. In the second step, a stream of steam oxidises the previously obtained molecule back to its starting state, therefore closing the cycle. Depending on the stoichiometry of the reactions, which is the relation of the reactants and products of the chemical reaction, these cycles can be classified in two categories.

=== Stoichiometric ceria cycle ===
The stoichiometric ceria cycle uses the cerium(IV) oxide ($CeO_2$) and cerium(III) oxide ($Ce_2O_3$) metal oxide pairs as oxygen carriers. This cycle is composed of two steps:

A reduction step, to liberate oxygen ($O_2$) from the material:

$2CeO_2 \longrightarrow Ce_2O_3+\frac{1}{2}O_2$

And an oxidation step, to split the water molecules into hydrogen ($H_2$) and oxygen ($O_2$), and/or the carbon dioxide molecules ($CO_2$) into carbon monoxide ($CO$) and oxygen ($O_2$):

- The reaction for hydrogen production: $Ce_2O_3 + H_2O \rightarrow 2CeO_2+H_2$
- The reaction for carbon monoxide production: $Ce_2O_3 + CO_2 \rightarrow 2CeO_2+CO$

The reduction step is an endothermic reaction that takes place at temperatures around 2,300 K (2,027 °C) in order to ensure a sufficient reduction. In order to enhance the reduction of the material, low partial pressures of oxygen are required. To obtain these low partial pressures, there are two main possibilities, either by vacuum pumping the reactor chamber, or by using an chemically inert sweep gas, such as nitrogen ($N_2$) or argon ($Ar$).

On the other hand, the oxidation step is an exothermic reaction that can take place at a considerable range of temperatures, from 400 °C up to 1,000 °C. In this case, depending on the fuel to be produced, a stream of steam, carbon dioxide or a mixture of both is introduced to the reaction chamber for hydrogen, carbon monoxide or syngas production respectively. The temperature difference between the two steps presents a challenge for heat recovery, since the existing solid to solid heat exchangers are not highly efficient.

The thermal energy required to achieve these high temperatures is provided by concentrated solar radiation. Due to the high concentration ratio required to achieve this high temperatures, the main technologies used are concentrating solar towers (CST) or parabolic dishes.

The main disadvantage of the stoichiometric ceria cycle lies in the fact that the reduction reaction temperature of cerium(IV) oxide ($CeO_2$) is at the same range of the melting temperature (1,687–2,230 °C) of cerium(III) oxide ($Ce_2O_3$). In the end, it results in partial melting and sublimation of the material, which can produce reactor failures such as deposition on the window or sintering of the particles.

=== Non-stoichiometric ceria cycle ===
The non-stoichiometric ceria cycle uses only cerium(IV) oxide, and instead of totally reducing it to the next oxidation molecule, it performs a partial reduction of it. The quantity of this reduction is commonly expressed as reduction extent and is indicated as $\delta$. In this way, by partially reducing ceria, oxygen vacancies are created in the material. The two steps are formulated as such:

Reduction reaction:

$CeO_2 \rightarrow CeO_{2-\delta} + \frac{\delta}{2}O_2$

Oxidation reaction:

- For hydrogen production: $CeO_{2-\delta}+\delta H_2O\rightarrow CeO_2+\delta H_2$
- For carbon monoxide production: $CeO_{2-\delta}+\frac{\delta}{2}CO_2 \rightarrow CeO_2+\frac{\delta}{2} CO$

The main advantage of this cycle is that the reduction temperature is lower, around 1,773 K (1,500 °C) which alleviates the high temperature demand of some materials and avoids certain problems such as sublimation or sintering. Temperatures above these would result in the reduction of the material to the next oxidation molecule, which should be avoided.

In order to reduce the thermal loses of the cycle, the temperature difference between the reduction and oxidation chambers need to be optimized. This results in partially oxidated states, rather than a full oxidation of the ceria. Due to this, the chemical reaction is commonly expressed considering these two reduction extents:

Reduction reaction:

$CeO_{2-\delta_{ox}} \rightarrow CeO_{2-\delta_{red}} + \frac{\Delta\delta}{2}O_2$

Oxidation reaction:

- For hydrogen production: $CeO_{2-\delta_{red}}+\Delta\delta H_2O\rightarrow CeO_{2-\delta_{ox}}+\Delta\delta H_2$
- For carbon monoxide production: $CeO_{2-\delta_{red}}+\frac{\Delta\delta}{2}CO_2 \rightarrow CeO_{2-\delta_{ox}}+\frac{\Delta\delta}{2} CO$

The main disadvantage of these cycles is the low reduction extent, due to the low non-stoichiometry, hence leaving less vacancies for the oxidation process, which in the end translates to lower fuel production rates.

Due to the properties of ceria, other materials are being studied, mainly perovskites based on ceria, to improve the thermodynamic and chemical properties of the metal oxide.

=== Methane driven non-stoichiometric ceria cycle ===
Since the temperatures needed to achieve the reduction of the material are considerably high, the reduction of the cerium oxide can be enhanced by providing methane to the reaction. This reduces significantly the temperatures required to achieve the reduction of ceria, ranging between 800-1,000 °C, while also producing syngas in the reduction reactor. In this case, the reduction reaction goes as follows:

$CeO_2+\delta CH_4 \rightarrow CeO_{2-\delta} + \delta CO+2\delta H_2$

The main disadvantages of this cycle are the carbon deposition on the material, which eventually deactivates it after several cycles and needs to be replaced, and the acquisition of the methane feedstock.

== Types of reactors ==
Depending on the type and topology of the reactors, the cycles will function either in continuous production or in batch production. There are two main types of reactors for these specific cycles:

=== Monolithic reactors ===
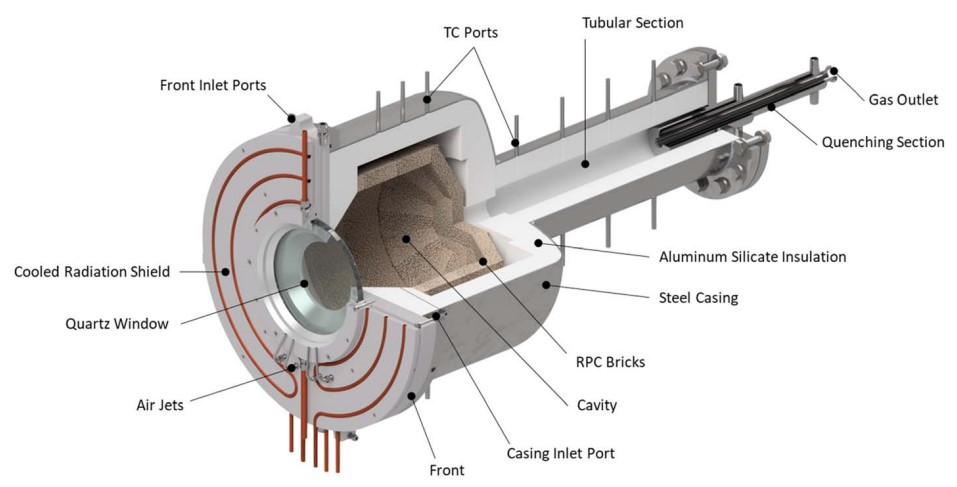
Monolithic ceria reactor for a methane driven cycle. The concentrated solar radiation enters to the cavity through the quartz window and heats the RPCs, triggering the reduction reaction when the temperature increases. In this case, methane enters the cavity through the inlet ports during the reduction.

These types of reactors consist on a piece of solid material, which is shaped as a reticulated porous foam (RPC) in other to increase both the surface area and the solar radiation penetration. This reactors are shaped as a cavity receivers, in order to reduce the thermal losses due to reradiation. They usually count with a quartz (fused silica) window in order to let the solar radiation inside the cavity.

Since the metal oxide is a solid structure, both reactions must be done in the same reactor, which leads to a discontinuous production process, carrying out one step after the other. To avoid this stops in the production time, multiple reactors can be arranged to approximate a continuous production process. This is usually referred as a batch process. The intention is to always have one or multiple reactors operating in the oxidation step at the same time, hence always generating hydrogen.

Some new reactor concepts are being studied, in which the RPCs can be moved from one reactor to another, in order to have one single reduction reactor.

=== Solid particles reactors ===
These types of reactors try to solve the discontinuity problem of the cycle by using solid particles of the metal oxide instead of having solid structures. This particles can be moved from the reduction reactor to the oxidation reactor, which allows a continuous production of fuel. Many types of reactors work with solid particles, from free falling receivers, to packed beds, fluidized beds or rotary kilns.

The main disadvantage of this approach is that, due to the high temperatures achieved, the solid particles are susceptible to sintering, which is a process in which small particles melt and get stuck to another particles, creating bigger particles, which reduces their surface area and difficult the transportation process.

== See also ==
- Thermochemical cycle
- Solar fuel
- Sulfur–iodine cycle
- Hybrid sulfur cycle
