= Microbial electrochemical technologies =

Microbial electrochemical technologies (METs) use microorganisms as electrochemical catalyst, merging the microbial metabolism with electrochemical processes for the production of bioelectricity, biofuels, H_{2} and other chemicals. Microbial fuel cells (MFC) and microbial electrolysis cells (MEC) are examples of METs. While MFC is used to generate electricity from organic matter typically associated with wastewater treatment, MEC use electricity to drive chemical reactions such as the production of H_{2} or methane. Recently, microbial electrosynthesis cells (MES) have also emerged as METs, where chemicals can be produced in the cathode compartment. Other MET applications include microbial remediation cell, microbial desalination cell, microbial solar cell, microbial chemical cell, etc.

== History ==
The use of microbial cells to produce electricity was perceived by M.C. Potter in 1911 with the finding that "The disintegration of organic compounds by microorganisms is accompanied by the liberation of electrical energy". An addition in MFC research was made by B. Cohen in 1931, when microbial half fuel cells stack connected in series was created, capable of producing over 35 V with a current of 0.2 mA. More developments were made in the late 1980s when two of the first known bacteria capable of transporting electron from the cell interior to the extracellular metal oxides without artificial redox mediators: Shewanella (formerly Alteromonas) oneidensis MR-1 and Geobacter sulfurreducens PCA were isolated. In late 90s, Kim et al. showed that the Fe(III)-reducing bacterium, S. oneidensis MR-1 was electrochemically active and can generate electricity in a MFC without any added electron mediators. These findings set basis for the development of electromicrobiology, and the field of MFC started. However, due to low power generation, it was also doubtful whether the MFC can be practical application on wastewater organics reduction. This view was changed when it was established that domestic wastewater could be treated to practical limits while simultaneously producing power. Furthermore, power densities two orders of magnitude higher was demonstrated in an MFC using glucose, without the need for exogenous chemical mediators. Building upon these works, a race to develop practical applications of MFCs initiated to emerge at a very fast pace, with the major goals being development of a large scale technology for the treatment of domestic, industrial, and other types of wastewaters.

In 2004, extracellular electron uptake (EEU) from cathodes to microbes (Geobacter spp.) was established with attached biofilm, where fumarate was reduced to succinate. This reverse reaction for electron transport generated the research field of MES. In 2010, Nevin et al. discovered that the acetogenic microorganism Sporomusa ovata can convert CO_{2} to acetic acid in MES cells by uptaking electrons from the cathode electrode. In the next years, also due to the growing concerns on greenhouse gas emissions, the field of CO_{2} bio-electroconversion in MES cell flourished. Several autotrophic microorganisms showed ability of capturing electrons from the cathode, either directly or through mediators. Besides specific microbial species, it was shown that CO_{2} reducing communities can be enriched in MES cells from inoculum sources such as sewage sludge, digester sludge or marine/river sediments. In the following decade, technical improvements led to an increase of acetate production rate from few to hundreds g/m^{2}_{cathode}/d. MES cells demonstrated also a promising technology for converting CO_{2} into biomethane, with production rates up to 200 L CH_{4}/m^{2}_{cathode}/d. Furthermore, the MES scope was expanded to target more valuable products, including ethanol and caproate.

== Principles ==
=== Microbial extracellular electron transfer ===
There are various mechanisms for bacteria to transfer electrons with an electrode. These include a "direct" process, where redox components located on the cell surface, that can be multiheme cytochromes or nanofilaments, contact directly with the solid surfaces, and an "indirect" process that is mediated by soluble redox mediators that cyclically shuttle electrons between cells and electrodes. Electron shuttles can be humic substances that are not produced by the cells, or secondary metabolites that are produced by the organisms including phenazines [32, 33] and flavins [34, 35]. In addition, some primary metabolites of bacteria, such as sulphur species and H_{2}, can convey electrons towards extracellular electron acceptors. In addition to heme cofactors in multiheme cytochromes, flavin mononucleotide also were shown to enhance the rate of electron transfer in some outer membrane cytochrome as redox cofactors [27]. Because electrons are transferred from the interior to the exterior of microbial cells across the cellular membrane during EET, ions with positive charge need to simultaneously move in the same direction as the electron flow to maintain charge neutrality.

=== Bioelectrochemical systems (principles, components, configurations) ===
A bioelectrochemical system (BES) is the device used in METs. A classic BES such as the MFC is typically composed of two sections. An anodic and a cathodic section separated by a selectively permeable, proton/cation exchange membrane or a salt bridge. In a MFC, the anodic section contains microbes that work as biocatalysts under anaerobic conditions in the anolyte, where the cathodic section contains the electron acceptor (e.g. oxygen). Electrons generated from the oxidation of organic compounds are conveyed to the anode. Electrons produced by the microbes are transferred to the anode directly via 'nanowires' or outer-membrane proteins, or indirectly using electron shuttling agents. These electrons reach the cathode across an external circuit and for every electron conducted, protons react at the cathode for completing the reaction and sustaining the electric current .There are numerous types of BES reactors but broadly they all share the same operating principles. Various designs and configurations have been established to optimize the assembly of the three basic elements (anode, cathode and separator) in a functioning system. The performance of BESs is significantly changed with their design.

== Potential Applications ==
=== Energy recovery and generation ===
==== Wastewater treatment with MFC ====
Pumping, aeration, and solids handling are the major energy consuming processes in wastewater treatment. Aeration alone can account for 50% of the operation costs at a typical wastewater treatment plant. Eliminating these costs can save a large amount of energy. MFCs in wastewater treatment, besides electricity generation, also help in energy savings linked to these mentioned processes which add a great advantage. The MFC process is an anaerobic process and sludge production for an anaerobic process is approximately 1/5 of that for an aerobic process. Thus, using MFCs could reduce solids production at a wastewater treatment plant, ultimately reducing significant operating costs for solids handling. Moreover, this technology has seen a nearly exponential increase in power production from the start of this century. This evolution echoes a mounting appreciation by engineers that this technology is ready to emerge as practical applications and associated technologies are likely to become important in the near future.

Through the treatment of wastewater by MFC technologies, the process of wastewater treatment would become an approach of producing energy in the form of electricity, rather than energy expenditure. MFCs were used for the determination of lactate in water by K.I.M. and coworkers, and later showed that electricity production in an MFC could be sustained by starch using an industrial wastewater. A great variety of substrates have been used in MFCs for electricity production varying from pure compounds to complex mixtures of organic matter present in wastewater. The application of MFC for biotreatment of wastewater has also recorded effective conversion of organic matter in wastewater into electricity with about 40-90% COD and BOD reduction. Currently, the energy that could be captured from wastewater is not enough to power a city, but it could be large enough to run a treatment plant.

=== Benthic MFC ===
Benthic MFCs generate power through the microbial oxidation of organic substrates in anoxic marine sediments coupled to reduction of oxygen in the overlying water column. Electrons are generated from the metabolism of the naturally occurring microorganism in the various sediments. As such, benthic MFCs do not require the addition of any exogenous microorganisms or electron shuttles. The weather buoys obtained their entire power from the benthic MFC allowing them to operate continuously and independently from the need to replace batteries. Benthic MFCs can be operated for several years with no decrease in power output. The researchers estimated that a benthic MFC could provide power indefinitely at the same power levels and the same cost as a deep-sea power and light enclosed lead acid battery could deliver for one year.

=== Nutrients recovery ===
Nitrogen and phosphorus are considered as major pollutants in the wastewater whose removal and recovery are required for sustainable treatment systems. Nitrogen is conventionally removed by biological nitrification and denitrification processes which involves a very high energy and cost in wastewater treatment. BESs has a good potential for the recovery of ammonium nitrogen with good profits from waste streams rich in nitrogen such as urine, swine liquor, digester liquor and landfill leachate, etc. Phosphorus from the wastewaters is conventionally recovered as polyphosphate granules, Fe-P or struvite by bacteria. Cusick et al. achieved struvite production in a BES by employing single-chamber MEC, where up to 40% soluble phosphate was recovered by struvite precipitation at a rate of 0.3–0.9 g/m^{2}/h. Other phosphorus recovery in BES involved exchange of hydroxide ions generated by the cathode reaction with phosphate ions from wastewater which resulted in removing 52.4 ± 9.8% of phosphate.

=== Microbial Electrochemical Remediation ===
BESs are known for both the oxidation and reduction-based processes for remediation of underground contaminants. In comparison to conventional biological treatment or chemical processes, BESs employ a single or multiple electrodes which are not closed reactors for pollutants' remediation. Solid electrodes in this system work as non-exhaustible electron acceptors/donors for stimulating microbial transformation of pollutants into non-toxic or less toxic forms. For example, enhancing the biodegradation of toxins with concomitant bioelectricity can be production. The complex petroleum organics, such as BTEX complexes (benzene, toluene, xylenes, and ethylbenzenes, etc.) can be bioremediated using BES systems. Morris et al reported that diesel (C8–C25) degradation was improved by 164% by introducing electrodes without power input. Investigations on biodiesel, phenol, total petroleum hydrocarbons, polycyclic aromatic hydrocarbons (PAHs), 1,2-dichloroethane, pyridine, etc., have been also stated, validating BES can be used as a practical technology for degrading petroleum hydrocarbon with simultaneous current generation. Chlorinated solvents like trichloroethene and tetrachloroethene, known for high toxicity or carcinogenic nature have been reported to degrade by using negatively polarized solid-state electrode which donate electrons with and without electron shuttles. The removal of nitrate, a common groundwater contaminant, have also been demonstrated either alone {Cecconet, 2018 #9} or in combination with other co-contaminants such as arsenite. In comparison to traditional denitrification which involves heterotrophic denitrifying bacteria, denitrification by BES involves autotrophic denitrifying bacteria which have the electrons uptake ability from the electrodes. Consequently, biocathodes in BES have been developed for denitrification which results in an efficient reduction of nitrate/nitrite at low energy costs in either groundwater and wastewater. In other studies, reduction of perchlorate, Cr(VI), Cu(II), and radioactive uranium have also been achieved in BESs with cathode as electron donors. The major benefit associated with the use of a solid electrodes as an electron donor instead of soluble electron donor is the reduction of contaminant (e.g., U(VI) to U(IV)) which is a stable precipitate at the electrode. Not only groundwater but also soil bioremediation have been explored using BES. For example, it has been demonstrated successful cleaning of herbicides and antibiotics in soil (Ref).

=== Microbial electrochemical production of chemicals ===
MES, a type of BES, can employ electricity for driving the synthesis of fuels and high value chemicals by employing microbes as cathodic catalysts which also results in the treatment of waste streams (Fig. 3). The dual benefits associated with this system are carbon sequestration and value added chemicals production. A wide range of valuable compounds have been produced by MES, such as H_{2}, acetate, CH_{4}, ethanol, butanol, H_{2}O_{2}, etc. The product spectrum in MES is largely governed by biocathodes materials (carbon- or metal-based), microorganisms involved, reduction potentials, and redox mediators activity, and operation conditions including pH, temperature and pressure. Potentials between -0.6 and -1.0 V vs SHE are typically applied to MES inoculated with mixed cultures to ensure production of hydrogen at the cathode, which is then uptake by acetogenic and methanogenic microorganisms to reduce CO_{2}. CO_{2} reduction at less negative potentials, even above the theoretical potential of -0.4 V vs SHE, ha been demonstrated for specific microorganisms such as Sporomusa, although is still debated whether this it to be attributed to direct electron uptake from the cathode or to favorable thermodynamics at the electrode surface. Most studies on MES has been performed under ambient (around 20 °C) or mesophilic (around 35 °C), but the process was demonstrated feasible under thermophilic conditions (50-70 °C). Neutral or slightly acidic pH (5.5-7.0) was shown optimal for CO_{2} conversion to acetic acid, although lower pH, or use of inhibitors such as bromoethane sulphonic acid (BESA), is required to avoid the onset of methanogenesis. The chemical compounds obtained from MES can be used as precursors for the production of downstream industrial products such as polymeric products, diesel or kerosene resembling products, plasticizers, and as lubricating agents in many industries.

Many organic compounds such as acetate, butyrate, and lactate, largely exists in effluents of wastewater plants and fermentation units. These organics are valued products, but due to their low concentrations, extraction is not a cost-effective option. Therefore, MES has been employed for the conversion of these short-chain carboxylic acids to longer chain acids and other useful products. Although higher value compounds can be obtained from low resource cost feeds, studies are required to compare if controlling the redox potential and supplying current to cathodes is economically feasible in comparison to current technologies. Nevertheless, further improvements in this technology platform can help in overcoming many of the fundamental challenges of a future bioeconomy.

=== Microbial electrolysis for production of H_{2} ===
When used for hydrogen production, the MEC needs to be supplemented by an external power source to get over the energy barrier of turning all organic material into carbon dioxide and hydrogen gas. A standard MFC is converted to a hydrogen producing MEC by supplementing > 0.14 V. Hydrogen bubbles form at the cathode and are collected to be used as fuel source. Although electricity is used instead of generated as in normal MFCs, this method of producing hydrogen is efficient because more than 90% of the protons and electrons generated by the bacteria at the anode are turned into hydrogen gas. Hydrogen can be accumulated and stored for later usage to overcome the inherent low power feature of the MFCs.

=== Microbial electrochemical biogas upgrading to CH_{4} ===
The concept of microbial electrochemical reduction involves the conversion of carbon dioxide which is the non-energy-rich component of the biogas produced in the anaerobic digester to the energy-rich component of methane. This reduction is possible through the chemical reaction between carbon dioxide, protons and electrons (from electricity) in a MES. This is otherwise known as Power-to-Gas technology, which allows electrochemical units to act as carbon sinks for industrial waste and more importantly industrial CO_{2} emissions. Power-to-Gas technology potentially generates biogas with a similar grade to natural gas without the need to remove CO_{2} using expensive techniques, such as amine scrubbing or pressure swing adsorption.

=== Water desalination ===
Desalination of sea water and brackish water used for drinking water has always presented significant problems because of the amount of energy required to remove the dissolved salts from the water. By using an adapted MFC, this process could proceed with no external electrical energy input. When adding a third chamber in between the two electrodes of a standard MFC and filling it with sea water, the cell's positive and negative electrodes attract the positive and negative salt ions, respectively, and the salt can be filtered out from the sea water using semi-permeable membranes. Salt removal efficiencies of up to 90% have been recorded in laboratory work.

=== Biosensors ===
MFCs have applications in monitoring and control of biological waste treatment unit due to their correlation of coulombic yield of MFC and strength of organic matter in wastewater which serves as readings for biosensors. Systems based on the microorganism Shewanella show promise as sensors for quantifying the biological oxygen demand in sewage. This concept can readily be expanded to detect other compounds that can act as electron donors for electricity production, such as hydrogen or aromatic contaminants. Also, such sensors could be extremely useful as indicators of toxicants in rivers, at the entrance of wastewater treatment plants, to detect pollution or illegal dumping, or to perform research on polluted sites.

With the development of micro-electronics and related disciplines the power requirement for electronic devices has drastically reduced. MFCs can run low-power sensors that collect data from remote areas. Anaerobic bacteria that naturally grow in the sediment produce the small current that can be used to charge a capacitor to store energy for the sensor. One major advantage of using a MFC in remote sensing rather than a traditional battery is that the bacteria reproduce, giving the MFC a significantly longer lifetime than traditional batteries. The sensor can thus be left alone in a remote area for many years without maintenance. Extensive research toward developing reliable MFCs to this effect, is focused mostly on selecting suitable organic and inorganic substances that could be used as sources of energy. Microbial current production is also applicable to bioelectrochemical sensors for drug screening to biofilm or wastewater-based epidemiology.

Photomicrobial Fuel Cells and Microbial Solar Cells

Research regarding microbial solar cell development began in the early 2000s and 2010s. Microbial solar cells (MSCs) utilize photosynthetic activity inherent to phototropic microorganisms, hence their classification as METs. The microbial solar cell differs from the standard microbial fuel cell (MFC) in that it does not require additional energy sources aside from light. MSCs may be paired with a fuel cell, in which case they may utilize the fuel of that fuel cell as an energy source, such as with a plant microbial fuel cell (PMFC). In such a case, the plant harnesses solar energy and ultimately secretes organic compounds into soil systems with active MFCs. All MSC variants rely on the same fundamental principles to process and produce energy. These principles begin with photosynthesis, followed by organic material transport, anodic oxidation of said material (via MFCs), and cathodic O_{2} reduction (figure 1).

Figure 1. PMFC diagram indicating electron transfer. The MET in this situation gains fuel from the preceding process of photosynthesis. The net gain of nutrients and glucose from photosynthesis act as the organic matter required to proceed with oxidation (left, anode) and subsequent reduction of O_{2} (cathode, right). The electron transfers within the system accumulate energy that is then harvested from the PMFC.

METs impact on greenhouse gas emissions

Greenhouse gas concerns have been acknowledged in recent years by researchers advancing their applications of METs to green energy. One such application is the utilization of anammox bacteria which transfer electrons via oxidation of ammonium, without producing harmful greenhouse gases including N_{2}O. Nitrous oxide (N_{2}O), is a powerful oxidizing agent, capable of causing detrimental harm to DNA activity and purine synthesis. N_{2}O, as well as nitrates and nitrites, have been particularly prevalent throughout past years, which has prompted many studies using anammox bacteria. The application of anammox bacteria does not result in accumulation of nitrites or nitrates because they are converted directly into N_{2} (figure 2).

METs in Biodiesel Production

Initial developments of METs were primarily focused on the utilization of organic matter to harness energy for external systems. The consumption of organic matter has become increasingly relevant as global food waste reaches levels of greater than a billion tons per year. To reuse this waste, fuels such as biodiesel have been created, allowing for energy to be extracted from discarded organic matter. Creating microalgae-based biodiesel can utilize an MET in the bacterial processing step to generate energy through an MFC, along with generating biodiesel through the bulk growth and harvesting of various algal species, including Chlorella vulgaris, Scenedesmus obliquus, Aurantiochytrium sp., Nannochloropsis oceanica, and Nannochloropsis sp. This growth is promoted by the nutrient dense extracts of food waste. The development of microalgae-based biodiesel from food waste is outlined in Figure 3, yielding Fatty Acid Methyl Esters (FAMEs), more commonly known as biodiesel.

Figure 2. Anammox bacteria conversion of nitrite and nitrate as compared to indirect conversion which can occur in bacteria, as well as archaea and eukaryotes. This indirect, sequential conversion allows for nitrous oxide and its reactants to accumulate in the environment

Figure 3. Schematic representation of food waste processing by METs. Lipidic food waste is hydrolyzed in order to separate lipid content from nutrient dense material which is used as a growth medium for microalgae strains. In growth the microalgae generate their own lipid content, which is harvested and processed similarly to the original lipid isolation. This process results in the extraction of Fatty Acid Methyl Esters (biodiesel).

== See also ==
- Geobacter
- Bacterial nanowires
- Exoelectrogen
- Bioelectrochemical reactor
