= Electrofuel =

Carbon-neutral drop-in replacement fuel

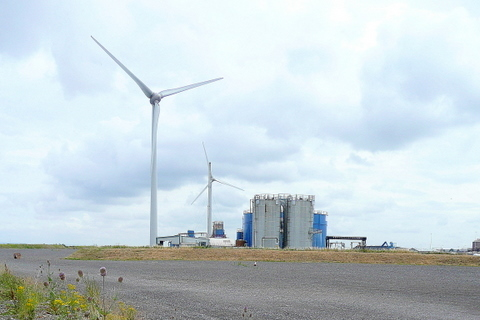
Electrofuels from renewable energy could replace fossil fuels.

Electrofuels, also known as e-fuels, are a class of synthetic fuels which function as drop-in replacement fuels for internal combustion engines. They are manufactured using captured carbon dioxide or carbon monoxide, together with hydrogen obtained from water splitting. Electrolysis is possible with both traditional fossil fuel energy sources, as well as low-carbon electricity sources such as wind, solar and nuclear power.

The process uses carbon dioxide in manufacturing and releases around the same amount of carbon dioxide into the air when the fuel is burned, for an overall low carbon footprint. Electrofuels are thus an option for reducing greenhouse gas emissions from transport, particularly for long-distance freight, marine, and air transport.

The primary targets are methanol, and diesel, but include other alcohols and carbon-containing gases such as methane and butane.

== Characterization ==
Electrofuels are hydrocarbons that are artificially synthesized from hydrogen and carbon dioxide. Carbon dioxide can be extracted from three different sources: from ambient air (direct air capture), from point sources such as power plants (carbon capture and utility) or from biomass. To maximize climate-friendly production, atmospheric capture by biomass or direct capture from the air by direct air capture are preferred. When using biomass, there are different ways of getting the CO_{2} needed. This can be achieved by the biome production of biogas or bioethanol. In all these processes, CO_{2} is produced as a by-product and must then be separated and purified. In the direct air capture process, ambient air is sucked in and transferred to a sorbent, in which the carbon dioxide forms a chemical bond with an absorbent or adsorbent, separating it from the air. Subsequently, during regeneration of the sorbent, or desorption, the carbon dioxide is separated by the addition of thermal energy and prepared for further use or storage.

Hydrogen can be produced in different ways. For CO_{2}-neutral e-fuels, it is essential to produce green hydrogen. With the help of renewable electricity, water can be separated into its components, hydrogen and oxygen, as part of water electrolysis.

To produce e-fuels, a synthesis gas consisting of hydrogen and carbon monoxide is provided, which is then converted into hydrocarbons in a subsequent synthesis process, which can then be used as a fuel. In the past, such synthesis processes have been carried out with other sources of carbon and hydrogen and there are therefore a number of different types of processes which could be used, e.g.:

- Sabatier reaction
- Fischer Tropsch synthesis
- Mobile Process (methanol to gasoline)

Thus, e-fuels are not primary energy sources, but secondary energy sources. They make it possible to use electric energy to produce fuels with high energy density, storage, transport and combustion properties which, due to their properties and versatility, can theoretically replace them in all possible applications. The fuels are chemically identical to the fossil counterpart and have identical properties. This similarity with fossil fuels make it possible to use them not only in the existing fleet, it is also possible to use them in use existing infrastructure in the form of sea transport, pipelines, tankers and filling station networks. At the same time, the difficulties of handling hydrogen are avoided.

Electrofuels are largely seen as a supplement and eventual replacement for fuels used in transport, such as jet fuel, diesel fuel, and fuel oil.

== Price ==
According to the study "The Future Costs of Electricity-Based Synthetic Fuels" published in 2018 by Agora Verkehrswende, synthetic fuels such as e-fuels need two prerequisites in order to be able to offer a competitive price. First, high full-load hours are essential, as the plant complexes for producing e-fuels require significantly high investment costs and consequently have high fixed costs. Each additional operating hour reduces costs. According to the study, at least 3,000-4,000 full-load hours are required per year.

The second important aspect is cheap electricity costs. The synthesis of e-fuels requires very large amounts of electricity and is characterized by conversion losses. In order to keep the price as low as possible, cheap renewable electricity is essential.

For this reason, the authors recommend producing in sunny and windy regions instead of using renewable electricity from off-shore wind turbines from regions like the North Sea or the Baltic Sea. Three of the regions examined provided excellent conditions and had the potential to significantly reduce the price. For instance, by utilizing PV systems in North Africa and the Middle East, the production costs of synthetic liquid fuels could reach as high as €11 cents per kilowatt-hour (€ct/kWh), equating to 0.96 euros per liter or 3.63 euros per gallon by 2030. (3,94 US-$ per Gallon based on calculations from 26 May 2024 without taxes). Another notable location, according to the authors, would be Iceland using existing geothermal energy.

Similar findings were reported in the 2018 report by Prognos AG, the Fraunhofer Institute for Environmental, Safety, and Energy Technology, and the German Biomass Research Center (DBF). According to their data, by 2050, with production in the MENA region and utilizing the Fischer-Tropsch process, depending on various parameters such as interest rates, electrolysis efficiency, direct air capture costs, electricity costs, as well as investment and production costs among others, manufacturing costs could range from at least €0.70/L to €1.30/L ( 2,88 US-$ per Gallon and 5,34 US-$ per Gallon based on calculations from 26 May 2024), excluding taxes.

== Research ==
A primary source of funding for research on liquid electrofuels for transportation was the Electrofuels Program of the Advanced Research Projects Agency-Energy (ARPA-E), headed by Eric Toone. ARPA-E, created in 2009 under President Obama's Secretary of Energy Steven Chu, is the Department of Energy's attempt to duplicate the effectiveness of the Defense Advanced Research Projects Agency, DARPA. Examples of projects funded under this program include OPX Biotechnologies' biodiesel effort led by Michael Lynch and Derek Lovley's work on microbial electrosynthesis at the University of Massachusetts Amherst, which reportedly produced the first liquid electrofuel using CO_{2} as the feedstock.

The first Electrofuels Conference, sponsored by the American Institute of Chemical Engineers was held in Providence, RI in November 2011. At that conference, Director Eric Toone stated that "Eighteen months into the program, we know it works. We need to know if we can make it matter." Several groups are beyond proof-of-principle, and are working to scale up cost-effectively. Porsche is currently considered to be the leader on these projects with their estimated cost per gallon of efuel at forty-five dollars per gallon.

Electrofuels have the potential to be disruptive if carbon-neutral electrofuels are cheaper than petroleum fuels, and if chemical feedstocks produced by electrosynthesis are cheaper than those refined from crude oil. Electrofuels also has significant potential in altering the renewable energy landscape, as electrofuels allows renewables from all sources to be stored conveniently as a liquid fuel and reducing curtailment.

As of 2014, prompted by the fracking boom, ARPA-E's focus has moved from electrical feedstocks to natural-gas based feedstocks, and thus away from electrofuels.

In 2021, Audi announced that it was working on e-diesel and e-gasoline projects. British company Zero, which was founded in 2020 by former F1 engineer Paddy Lowe, has developed a process it terms 'petrosynthesis' to create sustainable fuel and has set up a development plant in Bicester Heritage business centre near Oxford.

Stellantis (major brands: Alfa Romeo, Peugeot, Opel, Citroen and Chrysler) announced in September 2023 that it would approve the use of 28 million vehicles in Europe with Electrofuels. This information came after a lengthy test process in collaboration with Saudi Aramco. 24 engine families installed in Europe since 2014 were tested for exhaust emissions, startability, engine performance, reliability, durability, oil dilution, fuel tank, fuel lines and filters, as well as fuel performance in extreme cold and high temperatures. Stellantis expects to save up to 400 million tonnes of CO_{2} by 2050.

In 2023, a study published by the NATO Energy Security Centre of Excellence, concluded that e-fuels offer one of the most promising decarbonization pathways for military mobility across the land, sea and air domains.

== Efficiency ==
=== Energy conversion efficiency ===
Sankey diagram showing different energy efficiencies of battery electric vehicles and internal combustion engine vehicles using electrofuels

Because of high energy losses when converting electricity into electrofuels and electrofuels into mechanical energy, cars with internal combustion engines using electrofuels need 3-5 times more electricity than battery electric cars.

=== Regional differences ===
Diagram comparing efficiency of internal combustion engine vehicles using electrofuels and battery electric vehicles using different sources of renewable energy

Proponents of electrofuels for the use in internal combustion engine vehicles criticize the focus on energy conversion efficiency and argue with regions in the world having significantly higher potential for renewable energy than others, but lower local electricity demand, making it favorable to export that energy as liquid energy carriers. The eFuel Alliance, an advocacy group, states that "the perspective of the lack of efficiency of electrofuels is misleading as what is critical for global energy transition is not the degree of efficiency of electricity's end usage, but rather how efficiently electricity can be produced from renewable energies, and then made usable". Studies supporting this perspective found that by using favorable locations with very high potential for renewable energy, internal combustion engine vehicles can achieve similar efficiency to battery electric vehicles. This similar efficiency is ensured by increased electricity production in favorable locations (more full-load hours of renewable power plants per year), which is harnessed through power-to-fuel applications. According to these study results, a comprehensive efficiency ratio is not 5-7 but rather a manageable 1.6 (e.g., the figure "total efficiency of mobility").

Proponents of battery electric vehicles do not deny that in certain regions and/or during certain periods it is reasonable to convert electricity into hydrogen, synthetic hydrocarbons or other chemical energy carriers. They argue that those substances should not be used for road vehicles with regard to the demand in sectors as aviation, maritime transportation or the steel and chemical sector as for these industries there are no mature and efficient alternatives such as the battery electric road vehicles. Through cogeneration (combined cycle gas turbines or stationary fuel cells), electrofuels can be reconverted into electricy with the opportunity to use waste heat for the heating of buildings, combining the advantage of efficient renewable energy generation in favorable regions with the advantage of efficient energy use in the demand region. Even when charged with electricity from synthetic methane (Power-to-Gas-to-Power), battery electric vehicles are still significantly more efficient than internal combustion engine vehicles.

== Criticism ==
Some current processes that claim to produce electrofuels are powered by electricity generated by non-renewable fossil fuels; academics have acknowledged the necessity of these methods in the early stages of electrofuel production despite their counterintuitive nature.

By 2021, the European Federation for Transport and Environment, an advocacy group, advised the aviation sector needs e-kerosene to be deployed as it could substantially reduce their climate impact, and similarly for shipping. It also stated that electrofuel usage in cars emits two significant greenhouse gases beyond the CO_{2} captured for the production: methane (CH_{4}) and nitrous oxide (N_{2}O); local air pollution was still a concern, and it was five times less efficient than direct electrification.

== Classification ==
Europe defines a class of electrofuels called "Renewable Liquid and Gaseous Transport Fuels of Non-Biological Origin" (RFNBO), chemically the same as e-fuels in general, but with stricter requirements. The power must be made by new renewable unsubsidized power plants located in the same bidding zone as the e-fuel facility, power production and e-fuel production must occur simultaneously, and carbon sources must be certain types.

== Projects ==
In September 2022, the Finnish company Q Power sold P2X Solutions a synthetic methane production unit to be delivered in 2024 in Harjavalta, Finland, next to its 20 MW green hydrogen production plant. Ren-Gas has several synthetic methane production projects in Tampere, Lahti, Kotka, Mikkeli and Pori in Finland.

Towards the end of 2020, Porsche announced its investment in electrofuels, including the Haru Oni project in Chile, creating synthetic methanol from wind power. In December 2022, Porsche and Chilean company Highly Innovative Fuels opened the Haru Oni pilot plant in Punta Arenas, Chile, based on wind power and producing about 130,000 L (29,000 imp gal; 34,000 US gal) of eFuel per year in the pilot phase, with plans to scale to 55,000,000 L (12,000,000 imp gal; 15,000,000 US gal) per year by 2026, and 550,000,000 L (120,000,000 imp gal; 150,000,000 US gal) by 2028, to be exported through its port.

== See also ==
- ARPA-E
- Bioelectrochemical reactor
- Carbon-neutral fuel
- Electrochemical cell
- Electrochemical reduction of carbon dioxide
- Electrohydrogenesis
- Electromethanogenesis
- Enzymatic biofuel cell
- Hydrozine
- Methanol economy
- Microbial electrosynthesis
- Power-to-gas
- Power-to-X
- Phase-out of fossil fuel vehicles
