= Bioelectrochemical reactor =

A Bioelectrochemical reactor is a type of bioreactor where bioelectrochemical processes are used to degrade/produce organic materials using microorganisms. This bioreactor has two compartments: The anode, where the oxidation reaction takes place; And the cathode, where the reduction occurs. At these sites, electrons are passed to and from microbes to power reduction of protons, breakdown of organic waste, or other desired processes. They are used in microbial electrosynthesis, environmental remediation, and electrochemical energy conversion. Examples of bioelectrochemical reactors include microbial electrolysis cells, microbial fuel cells, enzymatic biofuel cells, electrolysis cells, microbial electrosynthesis cells, and biobatteries.

== Principles ==
Electron current is inherent to microbial metabolism. Microorganisms transfer electrons from an electron donor (lower potential species) to an electron acceptor (higher potential species). If the electron acceptor is an external ion or molecule, the process is called respiration. If the process is internal, electron transfer is called fermentation. The microorganism attempts to maximize their energy gain by selecting the electron acceptor with the highest potential available. In nature, mainly minerals containing iron or manganese oxides are reduced. Often soluble electron acceptors are depleted in the microbial environment. The microorganism can also maximize their energy by selecting a good electron donor that can be easily metabolized. These processes are done by extracellular electron transfer (EET). The theoretical free energy change (ΔG) for microorganisms relates directly to the potential difference between the electron acceptor and the donor. However, inefficiencies like internal resistance will decrease this free energy change. The advantage of these devices is their high selectivity in high speed processes limited by kinetic factors.

The most commonly studied species are Shewanella oneidensis and Geobacter sulfurreducens. However, more species have been studied in recent years.

On March 25, 2013, scientists at the University of East Anglia were able to transfer electrical charge by allowing bacteria to touch a metal or mineral surface. The research shows that it is possible to 'tether' bacteria directly to electrodes.

== History ==
In 1911 M. Potter described how microbial conversions could create reducing power, and thus electric current. Twenty years later Cohen (1931) investigated the capacity of bacteria to produce an electrical flow and he noted that the main limitation is the small capacity of current generation in microorganisms. Berk and Canfield (1964) didn't build the first microbial fuel cell (MFC) until the 60's.

Currently, the investigation of bioelectrochemical reactors is increasing. These devices have real applications in fields like water treatment, energy production and storage, resources production, recycling and recovery.

== Applications ==
=== Water Treatment ===
Bioelectrochemical reactors are finding an application in wastewater treatment settings. Current activated sludge processes are energy- and cost-inefficient due to sludge maintenance, aeration needs, and energy needs. By using a bioelectrochemical reactor that utilizes the concept of trickling filtering, these inefficiencies can be addressed. While processing wastewater using this reactor, nitrification, denitrification, and organic matter removal all take place simultaneously in both aerobic and anaerobic conditions using multiple different microbes located on the anode of the system. Though the processing parameters of the reactor affect the overall composition of each microbe, genus Geobacter and genus Desulfuromonas are frequently found in these applications.

== In popular culture ==
- In Final Fantasy: The Spirits Within, soldiers use power backpacks based on bacteria.
- In Subnautica, the player can build a bioreactor that serves the same purpose as a bioelectrochemical reactor.

== See also ==
- Bioelectrochemistry
- Bioelectronics
- Electrochemical cell
- Electrochemical energy conversion
- Electrochemical engineering
- Electrochemical reduction of carbon dioxide
- Electrofuels
- Electrolytic cell
- Electromethanogenesis
- Galvanic cell
