= Electrochemical energy conversion =

Electrochemical energy conversion is a field of energy technology concerned with electrochemical methods of energy conversion including fuel cells and photoelectrochemical. This field of technology also includes electrical energy storage devices like batteries and supercapacitors. It is increasingly important in context of automotive propulsion systems. There has been the creation of more powerful, longer running batteries allowing longer run times for electric vehicles. These systems would include the energy conversion fuel cells and photoelectrochemical mentioned above.

== See also ==
- Bioelectrochemical reactor
- Chemotronics
- Electrochemical cell
- Electrochemical engineering
- Electrochemical reduction of carbon dioxide
- Electrofuels
- Electrochemical hydrogen compressor
- Electrohydrogenesis
- Electromethanogenesis
- Enzymatic biofuel cell
- Photoelectrochemical cell
- Photoelectrochemical reduction of CO_{2}
