= MECC (disambiguation) =

MECC is the Minnesota Educational Computing Consortium.

MECC may also refer to:

- MATRADE Exhibition and Convention Centre, in Kuala Lumpur, Malaysia
- McKinley Exchange Corporate Center, an office building and bus terminal in Makati, Philippines
- MECC Maastricht, Maastricht Exhibition & Conference Centre
- Microbial electrolysis carbon capture
- Middle East Cancer Consortium, an international initiative on cancer treatment and research
- Middle East Council of Churches
- Minimized extracorporeal circulation
- Missouri Eastern Correctional Center, a male prison in central-eastern Missouri
- Mountain Empire Community College, a community college located in Big Stone Gap, Virginia
- Microsoft Excel Collegiate Challenge, a Microsoft Excel e-sport competition, first introduced in 2022
