= Magnetoelectrochemistry =

Branch of electrochemistry

Magnetoelectrochemistry is a branch of electrochemistry dealing with magnetic effects in electrochemistry.

== History ==
These effects have been supposed to exist since the time of Michael Faraday. There have also been observations on the existence of Hall effect in electrolytes. Until these observations, magnetoelectrochemistry was an esoteric curiosity, though this field has had a rapid development in the past years and is now an active area of research. Other scientific fields which contributed to the development of magnetoelectrochemistry are magnetohydrodynamics and convective diffusion theory.

== Effects of magnetic field ==
There are three types of magnetic effects in electrochemistry:

- on electrolytes
- on mass transfer
- on metal deposition

== See also ==
- Electrochemical engineering
- Magnetochemistry
- Electrochemical energy conversion
- Magnetic mineralogy
- Magnetohydrodynamics
