= Chemotronics =

Intersection field of Chemistry and Electronics

Chemotronics is an intersection field of chemistry (especially electrochemistry) and electronics dealing with the design of electrochemical and optical chemical sensors. One of pioneers of this field was Alexander Frumkin.

== See also ==
- Amperostat
- Bioelectrochemistry
- Bioelectronics
- Electrochemical engineering
- Potentiostat
