= Highly Innovative Fuels Australia =

Fuel development program

Highly Innovative Fuels (HIF) Australia is a carbon-neutral synthetic fuel development program operated by German automaker Porsche AG and international eFuel company HIF Global. The program was announced in April 2022, with the announcement of the first manufacturing and research plant in the state of Tasmania coming in July of that year, said plant is set to open in 2026.
