= E-gasoline =

Synthetic fuel created by Audi

E-gasoline or E-benzin is a synthetic fuel created by Audi for use in automobiles. Audi is developing the fuel together with Global Bioenergies S.A. E-gasoline is essentially a liquid isooctane fuel and it is considered to be a carbon-neutral fuel. The fuel is sulfur- and benzene-free.

== Production ==
It is currently produced from biomass in a two-step process. In the first step gaseous isobutene (C_{4}H_{8}) is produced by Global Bioenergies. Then, in the second step, Fraunhofer Center for Chemical Biotechnological Processes adds additional hydrogen to transform it into isooctane (C_{8}H_{18}).

== See also ==
- Electrofuel
