= HIF Global =

Electrofuel development program

- Trade name: HIF Global
- Company type: Subsidiary
- Industry: E-Fuels
- Founded: 2016
- Founders: AME
- Headquarters: Houston, Texas, United States of America
- Area served: Global
- Key people: César Norton (CEO)
- Products: Synthetic fuels
- Parent: AME, Porsche AG
- Divisions: HIF Asia Pacific; HIF Australia; HIF Chile; HIF USA; HIF EMEA
- Website: www.hifglobal.com

Highly Innovative Fuels Global, often shortened to HIF Global is an international electrofuel company founded in 2016 by Chilean-Peruvian company AME and backed by German automaker Porsche AG.

== History ==
In 2020, HIF announced their Haru Oni demonstration plant located in the Magallanes Region of Chile. R&D projects involving carbon-neutral liquefied gas (eGL) began at the plant in 2021 with production set to begin in May 2022.

Siemens Energy AG announced its partnership with the company in 2020.

In April 2022, HIF Australia announced its first facility, located in Tasmania, and is set to open in 2026. The project is the first of its type in Australia.

== See also ==
- HIF Australia
- Porsche
- Siemens Energy AG
