= Bioelectrochemistry =

Branch of electrochemistry and biophysical chemistry

Bioelectrochemistry is a branch of electrochemistry and biophysical chemistry concerned with electrophysiological topics like cell electron-proton transport, cell membrane potentials and electrode reactions of redox enzymes.

== History ==
The beginnings of bioelectrochemistry, as well as those of electrochemistry, are closely related to physiology through the works of Luigi Galvani and then Alessandro Volta. The first modern work in this field is considered that of the German physiologist Julius Bernstein (1902) concerning the source of biopotentials due to different ion concentration through the cell's membrane. The domain of bioelectrochemistry has grown considerably over the past century, maintaining the close connections to various medical and biological and engineering disciplines like electrophysiology, biomedical engineering, and enzyme kinetics. The achievements in this field have been awarded several Nobel prizes for Physiology or Medicine. Among prominent electrochemists who have contributed to this field one could mention John Bockris.

== See also ==
- Biomedical engineering
- Bioelectronics
- Bioelectrochemical reactor
- Biomagnetism
- Enzymatic biofuel cell
- Photosynthesis
- Protein film voltammetry
- Saltatory conduction
