= Alexander Frumkin =

Russian chemist

Alexander Naumovich Frumkin
- Алекса́ндр Нау́мович Фру́мкин
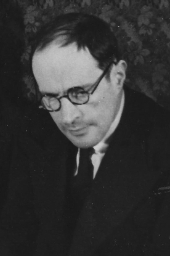
- Frumkin, director of the Physicochemical Research Institute named after L.Ya. Karpov, Moscow, March 1937
- Born: 24 October 1895; Kishinev, Bessarabia Governorate, Russian Empire
- Died: 27 May 1976 (aged 80); Tula, Russian SFSR, Soviet Union
- Scientific career
- Fields: Electrochemistry

Alexander Naumovich Frumkin (Russian: Алекса́ндр Нау́мович Фру́мкин; 24 October 1895 – 27 May 1976) was a Soviet Russian electrochemist, member of the Russian Academy of Sciences since 1932, founder of the Russian Journal of Electrochemistry Elektrokhimiya and receiver of the Hero of Socialist Labor award. The Russian Academy of Sciences' A.N. Frumkin Institute of Physical Chemistry and Electrochemistry is named after him.

== Biography ==
=== Early life ===
Frumkin was born in Kishinev, in the Bessarabia Governorate of the Russian Empire (now Moldova) to a Jewish family; his father was an insurance salesman. His family moved to Odessa, where he received his primary schooling; he continued his education in Strasbourg, and then at the University of Bern. Frumkin's first published articles appeared in 1914, when he was only 19; in 1915, he received his first degree, back in Odessa. Two years later, the seminal article "Electrocapillary Phenomena and Electrode Potentials" was published.

Frumkin moved to Moscow in 1922 to work at the Karpov Institute, under A.N. Bakh. In 1930, Frumkin joined the faculty of Moscow University, where in 1933 he founded—and would head until his death—the department of electrochemistry.

Frumkin was married three times, including a brief first marriage to Vera Inber.

=== Scientific career ===
During the Second World War, Frumkin led a large team of scientists and engineers involved in defense issues. This contribution did not save him from being dismissed in 1949 as the director of the Institute of Physical Chemistry, when he was accused of cosmopolitanism.

Frumkin's most fundamental achievement was the fundamental theory of electrode reactions, which describes the influence of the structure of the interface between electrode and solution (EDL) on the rate of electron transfer, especially emphasizing the involvement of the solvated electron and its free energy of solvation. This theory has been confirmed and extended within the framework of contemporary physical electron transfer model and mass transport in the Frumkin–Butler–Volmer Theory. Frumkin introduced the concept of the zero charge potential, the most important characteristic of a metal surface. The effect of adsorption on observed electrode kinetics is known as the Frumkin effect.

Alessandro Volta's question—a topic of discussion for over 120 years—about the nature of the EMF of electrochemical circuits was resolved using Frumkin's approach. Frumkin developed the Frumkin isotherm, an extension of the Langmuir isotherm in describing certain adsorption phenomena. Frumkin's students developed novel experimental methods that would, in time, become standard. Several applied electrochemical processes, including ones related to chemical sources of electrical power, industrial electrolysis, and anti-corrosion protection, were successfully developed under Frumkin's supervision.

== Honours and awards ==
- Hero of Socialist Labour - 1965
- Order of Lenin, three times
- Order of the Red Banner of Labour, three times
- Lenin Prize (1931)
- Stalin Prize, three times (1941, 1949, 1952)

Frumkin was nominated for Nobel Prize in Chemistry in 1946, 1962, 1963, 1964, 1965 and 1966, but he did not receive the Prize.

== See also ==
- Chemotronics
- Electrochemical kinetics
