= Zero (corporation) =

Synthetic fuel manufacturer

Zero Petroleum Limited
- Company type: Private
- Industry: Technology
- Founded: 2020
- Founder: Paddy Lowe and Nilay Shah
- Headquarters: London
- Area served: United Kingdom
- Owner: Privately-owned
- Website: Zero.co

Zero is a manufacturer of non-biological e-fuel claimed to be carbon-neutral, co-founded by former Formula One engineer Paddy Lowe and professor Nilay Shah. Its product is designed as an alternative to fossil-based fuels and a more scalable sustainable alternative to waste and biofuels.

In 2021, the Royal Air Force used its fuel to achieve a World Record first flight powered by synthetic fuel. In July 2022, Zero entered a new partnership with the Royal Air Force to move towards mass production of sustainable aviation fuel.

== History ==
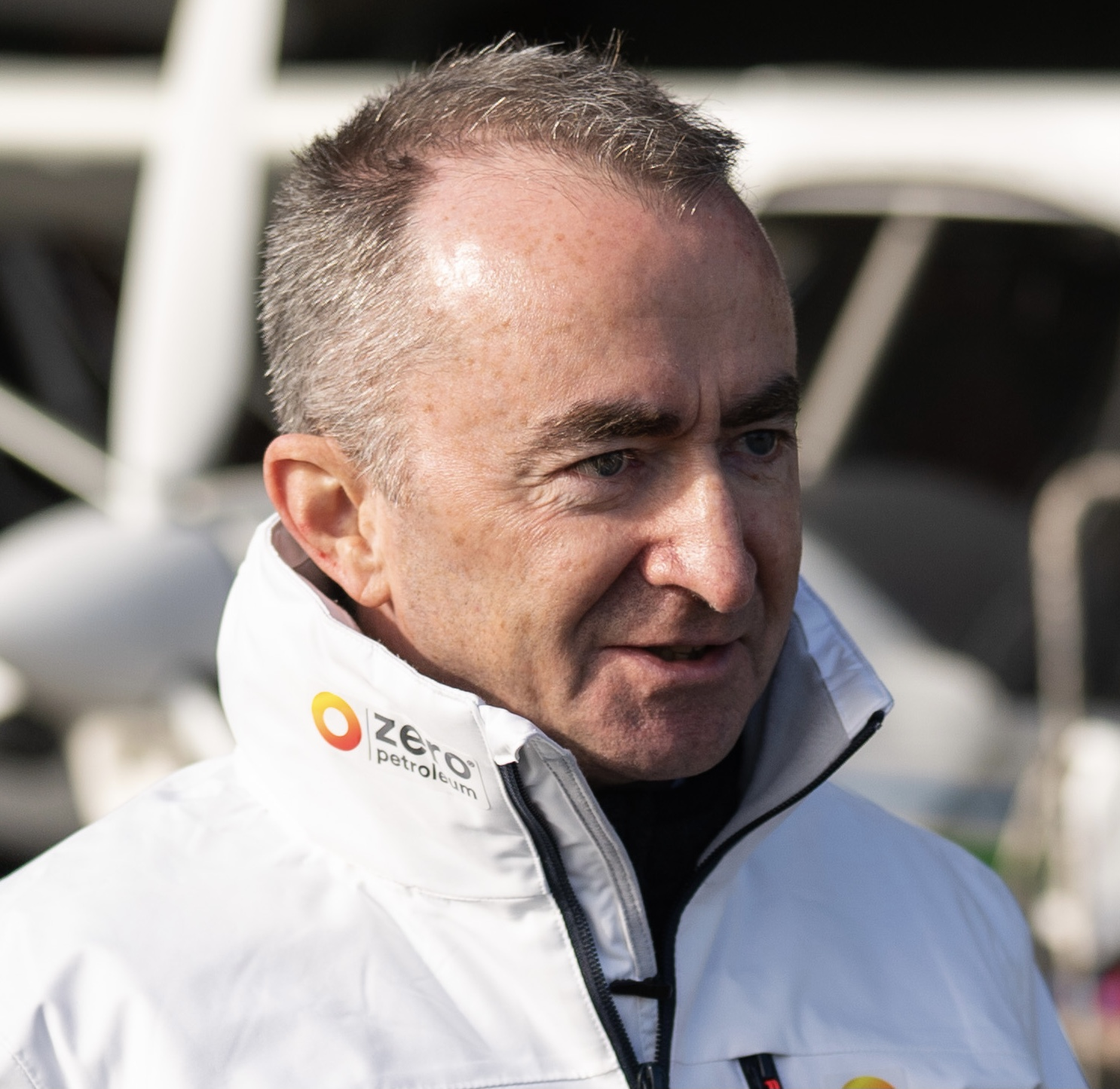
Paddy Lowe, founder and CEO of Zero

In March 2020, Zero Petroleum Limited, simply known as Zero, was founded by Paddy Lowe and Nilay Shah. Lowe is a former Formula One race engineer, while Shah is the Head of Imperial College London's Department of Chemical Engineering and received an OBE for services to the decarbonisation of the UK economy in 2020.

In September 2021, Zero received capital from a Glasgow-based investment syndicate with investors including Damon Hill. On 2 November 2021, the company's synthetic fuel was used by the Royal Air Force to achieve the world's first successful flight using only synthetic fuel. The fuel was manufactured in Orkney using locally generated wind, and tide and wave energy. The aircraft, an IKarus C42 microlight, was flown around Cotswold Airport. In February 2024, Zero signed a two-year sponsorship deal with Sauber Motorsport.

== Technology ==
Zero uses a specialised version of Fischer-Tropsch to manufacture target fuels (gasoline, kerosene, and diesel). Lowe claims that, when manufactured using renewable energy, synthetic fuel can be used as a carbon neutral or carbon negative direct drop-in replacement for fossil fuels to ensure the continued use of legacy vehicles. It is manufactured using the petrosynthesis process, in which carbon dioxide and hydrogen are combined to create hydrocarbons. The process involves direct air capture of carbon dioxide from the atmosphere and the electrolysis of water to obtain hydrogen. The carbon dioxide is converted into carbon monoxide in a Reverse Water-Gas Shift (RWGS) reactor and this combines with the hydrogen to create a syngas that is fed into a Fischer-Tropsch (FT) reactor to create the final hydrocarbon products. The use of renewable energy throughout the process results in the production of carbon neutral and carbon negative hydrocarbons.

== See also ==
- Carbon capture and storage
- Carbon-neutral fuel
- Synthetic fuel commercialisation
