= Microbial electrolysis carbon capture =

Microbial electrolysis carbon capture (MECC) is a carbon capture technique using microbial electrolysis cells during wastewater treatment. MECC results in net negative carbon emission wastewater treatment by removal of carbon dioxide (CO_{2}) during the treatment process in the form of calcite (CaCO_{3}), and production of profitable H_{2} gas.

Anthropogenic carbon dioxide emissions contribute to significant regional climate change due to the compound's contribution to the greenhouse gas effect in the atmosphere. Most mitigation goals to remove CO_{2} from the atmosphere are based on high levels of CO_{2} produced by fossil fuel combustion as a basis for energy production. The use of fossil fuels emits CO_{2} and other toxic compounds such as SO_{x} and NO_{x} in the process of combustion. Economic growth is reliant on energy production for transportation and industrial production of goods and services, the amount of CO_{2} emitted is predicted to continue to increase in the foreseeable future.

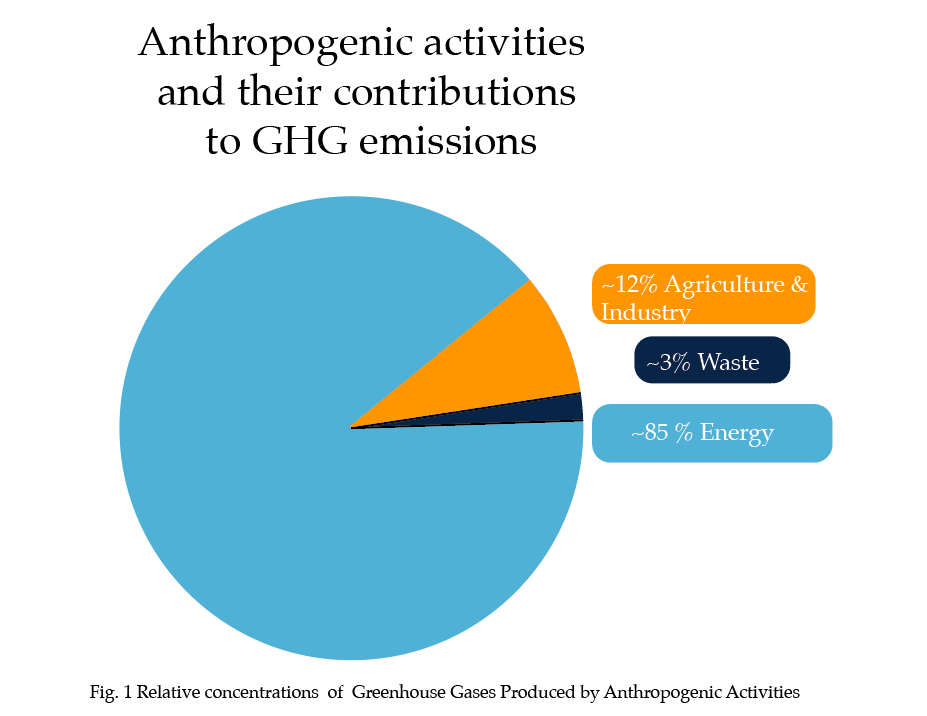
Net emissions of greenhouse gases of anthropogenic actions

Wastewater processing reflects a small percentage of greenhouse gas emissions. Currently, wastewater treatment consumes "3% of total electricity within the U.S." At least 12 trillion gallons of wastewater are treated in the United States alone per year, which contributes to 1.5% of global greenhouse gas emissions. Microbial electrolysis carbon capture (MECC) is a process that contributes to sustainable energy practice in both private and public sectors. MECC takes advantage of properties inherent to wastewater, such as organic content, to remove carbon dioxide and produce calcite precipitate and hydrogen gas.

== Background ==
Wastewater treatment plants are held accountable by The 2004 Greenhouse Gas Protocol Initiative for their emissions of greenhouse gases by the use of electricity to treat wastewater. For example, energy is required for the aeration process that releases volatile compounds from the water, and also for the mixing and transportation of polluted and recycled fluid moving throughout the process. The electricity generation process itself necessary for wastewater treatment produces CO_{2}, CH_{4}, and nitrous oxide. The aerobic treatment step of the water releases N_{2}O and CO_{2}, similar to the particle settling step, and the activated sludge step releases both CO_{2} and methane.

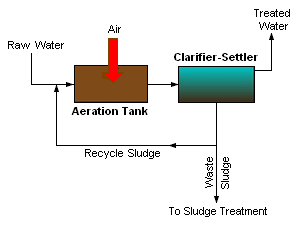
The activated sludge step in wastewater treatment releases compounds such as methane and CO_{2}.

Microbes in wastewater have the potential to enhance mineralization of CO_{2}. Mineralization of CO_{2} into CaCO_{3} immobilizes CO_{2} which prevent leakages by stabilizing underground pressure and reducing permeability of the cap rock. By Le Chatelier's principle, increasing Ca^{2+} availability and increasing pH will increase the rate of mineralization. Negatively charged surfaces on microbes have a high affinity for cations such as Ca^{2+} and, though metabolic function, increase saturation of CO_{2} in solution. In addition, bacterial ureolysis (hydrolysis of urea) increases pH of the solution.

== Technology of MECC using wastewater ==
The microbial electrolytic process uses wastewater as a source of charged ions and outputs hydrogen gas through the use of the microbial electrolysis cell. The wastewater itself provides electrolytes and is used to dissolve minerals. It is in the wastewater where reactions occur that bind CO_{2} molecules to make new substances.

On the anode, microorganisms called exoelectrogens interact with organic compounds to split hydrogen and produce CO_{2}. The resulting electrons travel through the circuit to the cathode, where they reduce water, to produce H_{2} gas and OH^{−} ions. The increased cathode pH dissolves silicate minerals, releasing metal ions such as Ca^{2+}. Protons (H^{+}) produced at the anode act with these metal ions to capture and ultimately mineralize CO_{2} into carbonate. Due to the high production of H_{2}gas, and the ability for the system to recycle up to 95% of the gas, the result is a gain of 57-63kJ/mol CO_{2} , or a gain of 63kJ per mol of CO_{2} captured.

The CO_{2} sequestered and H_{2} produced with this method, as well as being "net energy positive" are specifically mentioned as the highlights of the process, as well as the opportunity to use recycled materials such as HCO3^{−} produced by the MECC which is useful for water treatment plants. The water leftover can be given to the external CO_{2} emissions plants (such as coal power). An advantage of the MECC process over other alternative approaches like anaerobic digestion is that MECC works well at low temperatures, small-scale, and low COD concentrations. The economics section describes current economic disadvantages of this process.

== Economics of MECC ==
Microbial electrolytic carbon capture has yet to be implemented in present wastewater plants, therefore economic cost and benefits are current projections based on research of the technology rather than operational data. Lu et al. 2015 summarize the potential economic benefits of MECC use in their 2015 article in which they define the method of MECC. Their results estimate a “$48 per ton CO_{2} mitigated” net cost for MECC technology applied to wastewater plants. This estimation factors in the parasitic energy costs, operational costs and initial capital required to perform MECC, as well as potential cost offsets such as revenue due to water treatment, H_{2} production, and reduction in fossil fuel consumption for commercial manufacturing of H_{2} and treatment of wastewater.

The projected net cost of $48 per ton of mitigated CO_{2} is lower than estimated costs for pulverized coal power plant post-combustion carbon capture absorption using MEA and geologic sequestration ($65/t-CO_{2}), which is currently the most prolific Carbon Capture and Sequestration (CCS) technique. The MECC cost projection is also lower than the cost of many other CCS technologies: the direct air CO_{2} capture methods (about $1000/t-CO_{2}), the Bio-Energy Carbon Capture and Storage (BECCS) technique ($60–250/t-CO_{2}), the abiotic electrolytic dissolution of silicate method ($86/t-CO_{2}), and the pulverized coal power plant carbon capture by absorption and membrane techniques ($70–270/t-CO_{2}). The economics of MECC approach to carbon capture will benefit from future investigation in optimizing design and materials used. Further research is needed to predict the scope of costs and setbacks related to engineering and running a functional MECC system within current wastewater plants.

Critics of MECC discuss inefficiencies of the process, installation, materials, and potential setbacks that may result in economic losses. Although MECC is projected to be cheaper than other existing carbon capture techniques, it is considerably more expensive (on the order of 800 times more expensive) than present wastewater treatment technology and therefore faces a substantial barrier to implementation in public and private wastewater treatment plants. Furthermore, the efficiency of Microbial Fuel Cell technology, which is analogous to the microbial system used within MECC, has been criticized for its unpredictability due to relying upon the chemical and nutrient content of varying wastewater, as well as the health of living microbes. Inefficient MFCs lead to greater operation costs as cost offset fluctuates with departure from maximum efficiency of the system.
