= Microbial electrosynthesis =

Microbial electrosynthesis (MES) is a form of microbial electrocatalysis in which electrons are supplied to living microorganisms via a cathode in an electrochemical cell by applying an electric current. The electrons are then used by the microorganisms to reduce carbon dioxide to yield industrially relevant products. The electric current would ideally be produced by a renewable source of power. This process is the opposite to that employed in a microbial fuel cell, in which microorganisms transfer electrons from the oxidation of compounds to an anode to generate an electric current.

== Comparison to microbial electrolysis cells ==
Microbial electrosynthesis (MES) is related to microbial electrolysis cells (MEC). Both use the interactions of microorganisms with a cathode to reduce chemical compounds. In MECs, an electrical power source is used to augment the electrical potential produced by the microorganisms consuming a source of chemical energy such as acetic acid. The combined potential provided by the power source and the microorganisms is then sufficient to reduce hydrogen ions to molecular hydrogen. The mechanism of MES is not well understood, but the potential products include alcohols and organic acids. MES can be combined with MEC in a single reaction vessel, where substrate consumed by the microorganisms provides a voltage potential that is lowered as the microbe ages. "MES has gained increasing attention as it promises to use renewable (electric) energy and biogenic feedstock for a bio-based economy."

== Applications ==
Microbial electrosynthesis may be used to produce fuel from carbon dioxide using electrical energy generated by either traditional power stations or renewable electricity generation. It may also be used to produce speciality chemicals such as drug precursors through microbially assisted electrocatalysis.

Microbial electrosynthesis can also be used to "power" plants. Plants can then be grown without sunlight.

== See also ==
- Electrofuels
- Electrohydrogenesis
- Electromethanogenesis
- Glossary of fuel cell terms
- Microbial fuel cell
