= Electromethanogenesis =

Electromethanogenesis is a form of electrofuel production where methane is produced by direct biological conversion of electrical current and carbon dioxide.

Methane producing technologies garnered interest from the scientific community prior to 2000, but electromethanogenesis did not become a significant area of interest until 2008. Publications concerning catalytic methanation increased from 44 to over 130 between 2008 and 2017. Electromethanogenesis has drawn more research due to its proposed applications. The production of methane from electrical current may provide an approach to renewable energy storage. Electrical current produced from renewable energy sources may, through electromethanogenesis, be converted into methane which may then be used as a biofuel. It may also be a useful method for the capture of carbon dioxide which may be used for air purification.

In nature, methane formation occurs biotically and abiotically. Abiogenic methane is produced on a smaller scale and the required chemical reactions do not necessitate organic materials. Biogenic methane is produced in anaerobic natural environments where methane forms as the result of the breakdown of organic materials by microbes—or microorganisms. Researchers have found that the biogenic methane production process can be replicated in a laboratory environment through electromethanogenesis. The reduction of CO_{2} in electromethanogenesis is facilitated by an electrical current at a biocathode in a microbial electrolysis cell (MEC) and with the help of microbes and electrons (Equation 1) or abiotically produced hydrogen (Equation 2).

(1) CO_{2} + 8H^{+} + 8e^{−} ↔ CH_{4} + 2H_{2}O

(2) CO_{2} + 4H_{2} ↔ CH_{4} + 2H_{2}O

== Biocathode ==
A biocathode is a cathode used in a microbial electrolysis cell during electromethanogenesis that utilizes microorganisms to catalyze the process of accepting electrons and protons from the anode. A biocathode is usually made of a cheap material, such as carbon or graphite, like the anode in the MEC. The microbe population that is placed on the biocathode must be able to pick up electrons from the electrode material (carbon or graphite) and convert those electrons to hydrogen.

== Mechanism ==
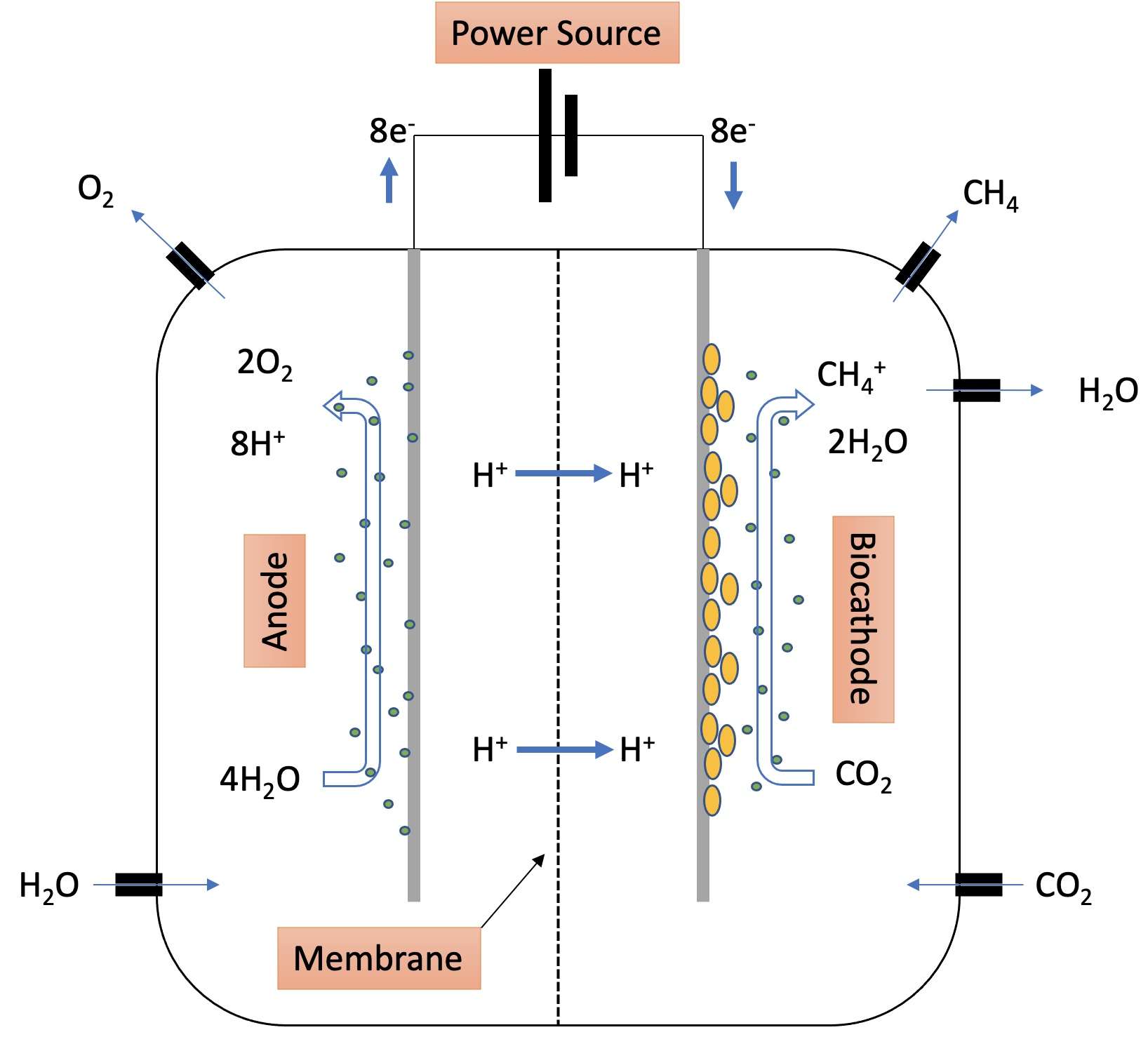
Figure 1: Example of a two-chamber methane-producing system where electromethanogenesis takes place.

The mechanism of electromethanogenesis is outlined in Figure 1. Water is introduced into the system with the anode, biocathode, and microbes. At the anode, microbes attract H_{2}O molecules which are then oxidized after an electrical current is turned on from the power source. Oxygen is released from the anode side. The protons and electrons oxidized from the H_{2}O move across the membrane where they move into the material that makes up the biocathode. The new microbe on the biocathode has the ability to transfer the new electrons from the biocathode material and convert them into protons. These protons are then used in the major pathway that drives methane production in electromethanogenesis—CO_{2} reduction. CO_{2} is brought in on the biocathode side of the system where it is reduced by the protons produced by the microorganisms to yield H_{2}O and methane (CH_{4}^{+}). Methane is produced and can then be released from the biocathode side and stored.

== Limitations ==
One limitation is the energy loss in methane-producing bioelectrochemical systems. This occurs as a result of overpotentials occurring at the anode, membrane, and biocathode. The energy loss reduces efficiency significantly. Another limitation is the biocathode. Because the biocathode is so important in electron exchange and methane formation, its make-up can have a dramatic effect on the efficiency of the reaction. Efforts are being made to improve the biocathodes used in electromethanogenesis through combining new and existing materials, reshaping the materials, or applying different "pre-treatments" to the biocathode surface, thereby increasing biocompatibility.

== See also ==
- Bioelectrochemical reactor
- Electrochemical energy conversion
- Electrochemical engineering
- Electrochemical reduction of carbon dioxide
- Electrohydrogenesis
- Microbial fuel cell
- Photoelectrolysis
- Sabatier reaction
