= Paddy Lowe =

British Formula One engineer (born 1962)

Paddy Lowe FREng
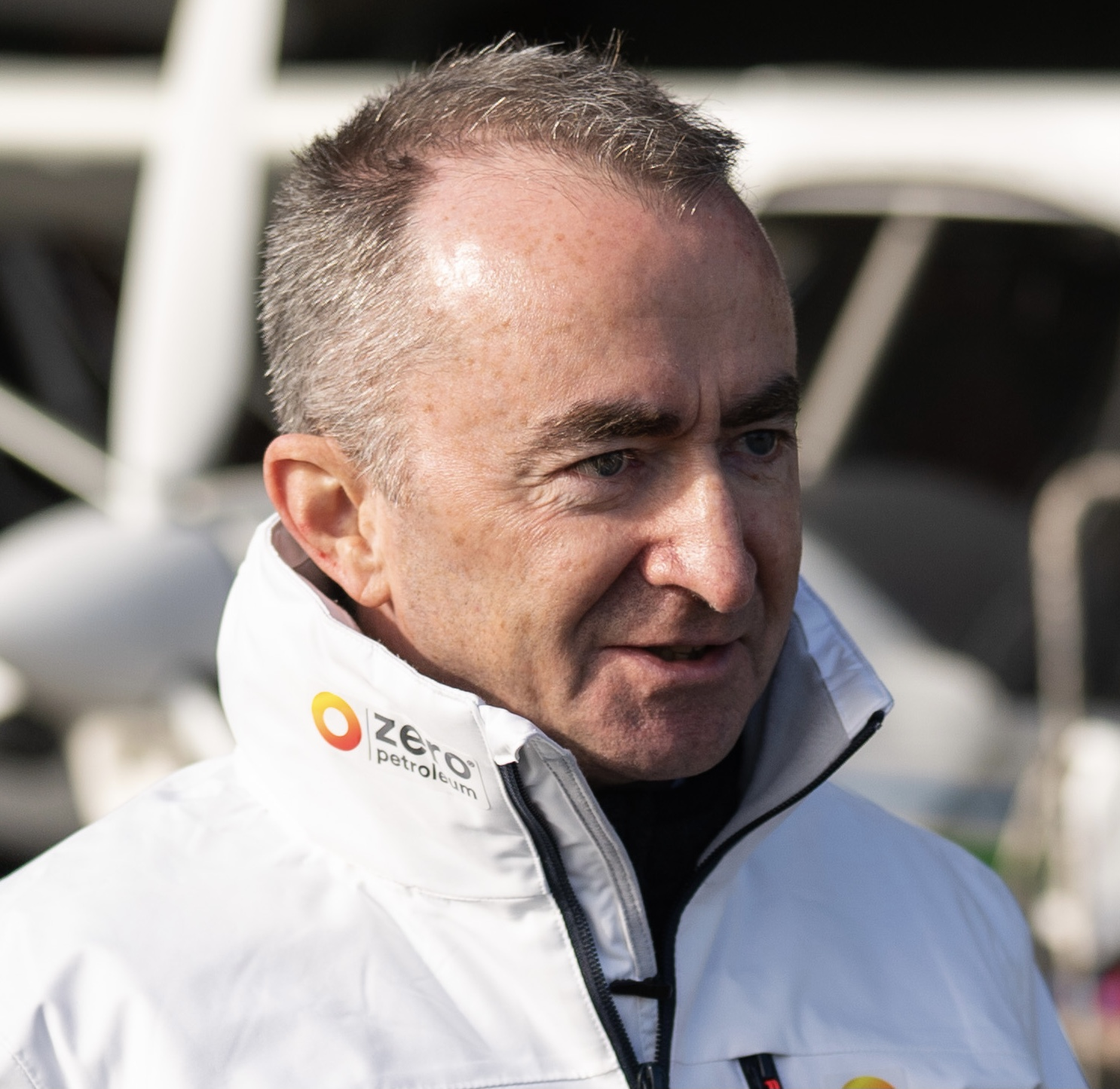
- Lowe in 2021
- Born: Patrick Allen Lowe; 8 April 1962 (age 64); Nairobi, British Kenya
- Education: Sevenoaks School; Sidney Sussex College; University of Cambridge
- Occupations: Founder and CEO of Zero, former Formula One Chief Technical Officer
- Spouse: Anna Danshina
- Children: 2

Patrick Allen Lowe (born 8 April 1962) is the founder and CEO of the fossil-free synthetic fuel company Zero. A former motor racing engineer and computer scientist, he spent 32 years working in Formula One, serving as Chief Technical Officer at Williams Racing, Executive Director (Technical) at Mercedes Formula One team, and Technical Director at McLaren. He was involved with cars that won 12 World Championships (7 Drivers' and 5 Constructors') and secured 158 race wins. He left Formula One in 2019 and co-founded Zero in 2020.

== Early life and education ==
Lowe was born on 8 April 1962 in Nairobi, British Kenya. He attended Sevenoaks School from 1976 until 1980 and graduated from Sidney Sussex College, Cambridge, in 1984 with a degree in Engineering.

== Formula One career ==
Lowe worked in Formula One over four decades, developing at least seven championship-winning cars. He was involved in cars that won 12 World Championships (7 Drivers' and 5 Constructors'), 158 Grands Prix, and 10 Autosport Racing Car of the Year awards, pioneering innovative systems including active suspension, traction control, automatic clutch control, active differentials, anti-lock brakes, driving simulators, and hybrid engines. He was the Technical Director behind the first 53 wins of Lewis Hamilton's record-breaking career and he led the Mercedes team to 19 wins from 21 races in 2016.

=== Williams (1987–1993) ===
In 1987, Lowe was employed by Williams as Joint Head of Electronics. He spent six years at Williams, during which time he oversaw the development of active suspension, used to help Nigel Mansell and Williams win the 1992 Drivers' and Constructors' titles.

=== McLaren (1993–2013) ===
Lowe moved to McLaren in 1993, when he was employed as Head of Research and Development, a department subsequently renamed Vehicle Technology. He is credited for helping Mika Häkkinen against Michael Schumacher, winning the Constructors' title in 1998 and the Drivers' title in 1998 and 1999. Lowe was head of the department for eight years until 2001, when he was appointed Chief Engineer Systems Development, a role focusing on the race programme. In 2005, he assumed the role of Engineering Director, which gave him responsibility for all the engineering departments. The McLaren MP4-20 proved fast but unreliable, winning 10 Grands Prix but losing both Drivers' and Constructors' titles. In 2008, he led Lewis Hamilton to his first Drivers' title. In January 2011, Lowe became the team's Technical Director. He left McLaren in 2013.

=== Mercedes (2013–2017) ===
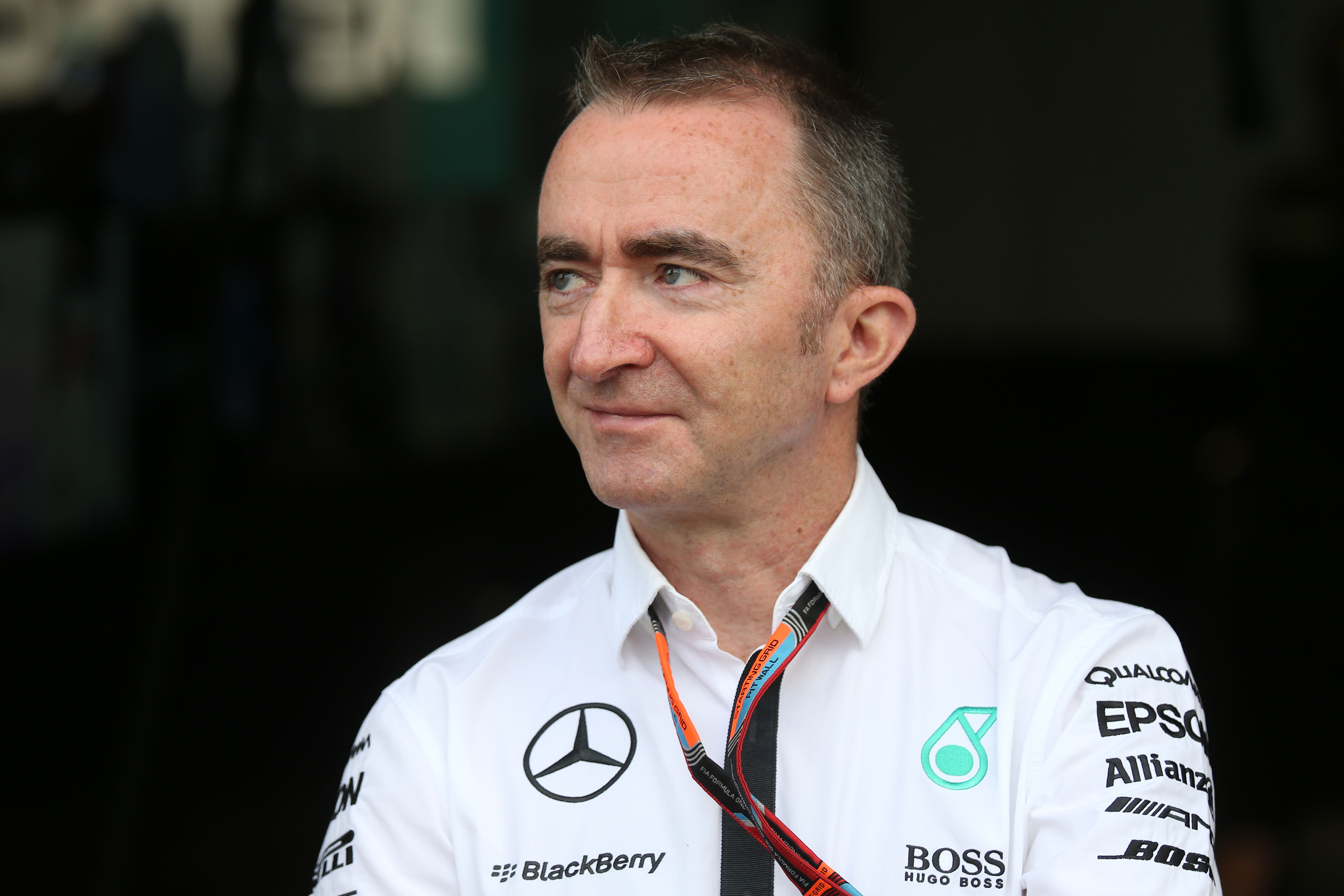
Lowe with Mercedes during the 2015 Italian Grand Prix

Lowe moved to Mercedes Formula One team as Executive Director on 3 June 2013. In 2015, Lowe was elected a Fellow of the Royal Academy of Engineering. He and his elder brother, Michael Lowe, were the first brothers to both be elected as a Fellow of the Royal Academy of Engineering. Lowe has been credited for having "laid the foundations for the team's crushing dominance of the V6 turbo era", and called "a key architect of Mercedes' Formula 1 domination", winning Lewis Hamilton the 2014 and 2015 Drivers' titles and Nico Rosberg the 2016 Drivers' title, also winning three consecutive Constructors' titles in the process by almost 300 points each time; Mercedes under Lowe won 51 out of 59 Grands Prix, took 56 out of 59 pole positions, and led 84 percent of the racing laps. On 10 January 2017, Mercedes announced that Lowe had left the team and entered a period of garden leave.

=== Return to Williams (2017–2019) ===
As part of a deal that brought Valtteri Bottas to Mercedes, Lowe returned to Williams as Chief Technical Officer on 16 March 2017. He replaced Pat Symonds, who left the team at the end of 2016. Alongside his technical position, Lowe became a shareholder in the team, making him the team's most senior figure. The Williams cars under his supervision, FW41 and FW42, turned out to be largely uncompetitive and relegated Williams to the bottom of the Constructors' Championship in 2018 and 2019, even missing the 2019 pre-season testing. On 6 March 2019, it was announced that Lowe would be taking a leave of absence for personal reasons. On 25 June 2019, Lowe left Williams with immediate effect.

== Zero Petroleum Limited ==
A proponent of synthetic fuels as part of the automotive industry's cleaner future, Lowe is the co-founder of Zero. Founded in 2020 as Zero Petroleum Limited, it is a British technology company that develops and manufactures whole-blend synthetic, non-biological, and fossil-free fuels including petrol (gasoline), diesel, and jet fuel. Its product is designed as an alternative to fossil-based fuels and a more scalable sustainable alternative to waste and biofuels. The process uses just carbon dioxide taken from the air and renewable hydrogen made from water; Lowe calls this process petrosynthesis. Synthetic fuels, which can be made at scale, can be dropped straight into the existing engines of cars, aircraft, commercial, and agricultural vehicles, allowing them to run sustainably in exactly the same way and with the same performance as they do on fossil fuels, without the need for any engine modification. They eliminate greenhouse gas accumulation through the creation of a circular carbon cycle, and so eliminate the need for fossil fuels in global industries such as aviation. Lowe, who has been described as "a former top F1 chief engineer who wants to transform the fuel industry", observed: "We're all hardwired to consider petroleum and fossil fuels as one and the same thing, but they're not. Fossil petroleum is a bad thing for the future, and it's becoming abundantly clear that we need to move away from it. But petroleum itself is a fantastic set of chemicals, both for energy and as the basis of everything from plastics to pharmaceuticals. It simply isn't feasible to move away from petroleum, so the question is how do we make it synthetically?"

== Personal life ==
Lowe is married to screen actress Anna Danshina. He has two children from a previous relationship: Noah Kelly and Finty Kelly. His brother, Michael Lowe, is a British mechanical engineer who is five years his senior and with whom he used to dismantle various bicycles and engines.

== Awards and honours ==
=== Formula One World Championships ===
Season	World Championship		Chassis	Engine	Statistics					
Season	Constructors'	Drivers'	Chassis	Engine	Races	Wins	Poles	F/Laps	Podiums	WCC
1992	Lowe was Head of Electronics									
1992	(United Kingdom) Williams	(United Kingdom) Nigel Mansell	FW14B	Renault	16	10	15*	11*	21	1st
1998	Lowe was Head of Research and Development									
1998	(United Kingdom) McLaren	(Finland) Mika Häkkinen	MP4/13	Mercedes	16	9	12	9	20	1st
1999	—N/a	(Finland) Mika Häkkinen	MP4/14	Mercedes	16	7	11	9	16	2nd
2008	Lowe was Engineering Director									
2008	—N/a	(United Kingdom) Lewis Hamilton	MP4/23	Mercedes	18	6	8	3	13	2nd
2014	Lowe was Executive Director									
2014	(Germany) Mercedes	(United Kingdom) Lewis Hamilton	W05	Mercedes	19	16	18	12	31	1st
2015	(Germany) Mercedes	(United Kingdom) Lewis Hamilton	W06	Mercedes	19	16	18	13*	32	1st
2016	(Germany) Mercedes	(Germany) Nico Rosberg	W07	Mercedes	21	19*	20†	9	33†	1st

Notes

Key: (Bold) personal record; (*) constructor record; (†) Formula One record

=== Other awards ===
- Autosport Racing Car of the Year awards (10)
- Fellow of the Royal Academy of Engineering (2015)
