= Microbial desalination cell =

A microbial desalination cell (MDC) is a biological electrochemical system that implements the use of electro-active bacteria to power desalination of water in situ, resourcing the natural anode and cathode gradient of the electro-active bacteria and thus creating an internal supercapacitor. Current applications in electrocoagulation, such as microbial desalination cells, are able to desalinate and sterilize formerly unavailable water to render it suitable for safe water supply.

== MDC Structure ==
An MDC is constructed similarly to a microbial fuel cell by including two chambers with two electrodes, an anode and a cathode, in addition to both a third chamber separated by an anion exchange membrane (AEM) and cation exchange membrane (CEM), and a peripheral, external circuit that is responsible for aerobic and anaerobic processes at each respective electrode. Organic matter from the sludge proliferates in the anode chamber and creates a biofilm that generates an electric current. The biofilm thus begins to oxidize the pollutants in the sludge by strictly adhering to the anode, freeing both electrons and protons from the bio-sludge, creating a current of atoms that are collected by the electrodes through circuit transportation. Electrical current is produced by the potential difference generated between the anode and cathode due to the aerobic nature of the cathode chamber.

== Applications ==
=== Seawater desalination ===
MDCs are utilized in seawater desalination by primarily acting as a precursor treatment for electrodialysis (ED) due to the inefficiency in salinity removal due to biofouling and membrane scaling by the complex ion composition. Studies show that efficacy of MDC systems diminish over 5000 hours due to membrane scaling such as calcium and potassium accumulation, increasing ohmic resistance and reducing ion exchange through the membrane. However, by utilizing MDCs as a precursor treatment for electrodialysis, results show that system time is reduced by 25% and energy expenditure decreases by 45.3%. Reduction in external resistance increases desalination efficiency to as high as 74%, as demonstrated in upflow microbial desalination cells (UMDC), but increased membrane scaling on the ion exchange membranes by calcium and magnesium accumulation, resulting in a higher internal ohmic resistance and decrease in overall desalination of seawater. With the application of an osmotic MFC (OsMFC) in conjunction with the UMDC as an initial pretreatment of biosolid removal and desalination, 85% of oxygen demand and approximately 97% of salts was reduced after secondary treatment. Subsequent treatment by traditional BES systems such as electrodialysis can function as a more effective system for desalination, provisioning energy demands by the output energy obtained from the MDC pretreatment.

=== Brackish water desalination ===
As MDCs contain low electrical conductivity in the desalination chamber and additional energy is not applied to the system, electron conductive-resins are applied to improve conductivity, decrease internal resistance and increase the desalination process of brackish waters. Brackish waters are low in salinity with a high amount of total dissolved solids, which results in difficulties in maintaining strong electrical currents due to increased internal resistance in the cell. MDCs also experience problems with the saturation of ions in the anode chamber which can be combatted by utilizing a microbial capacitive desalination cell (MCDC). MCDCs are analogous to MDCs with the exception of modification to the cation membrane by the addition of activate carbon cloth, permitting the free exchange of protons across both chambers of the cell and increasing the efficiency of desalination.

=== Groundwater denitrification ===
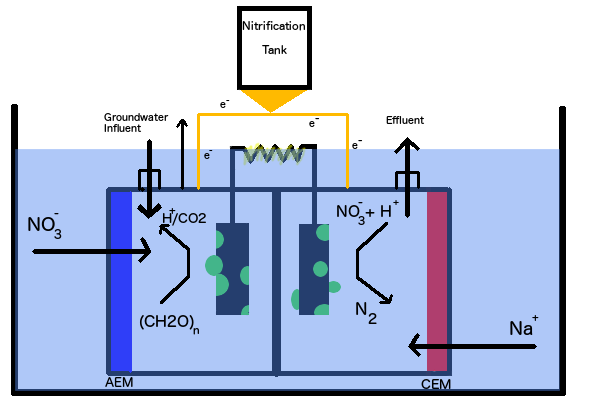
Submerged microbial desalination-denitrification cell supplied with synthetic groundwater and a wastewater supply for denitrification and desalination of influent groundwater .

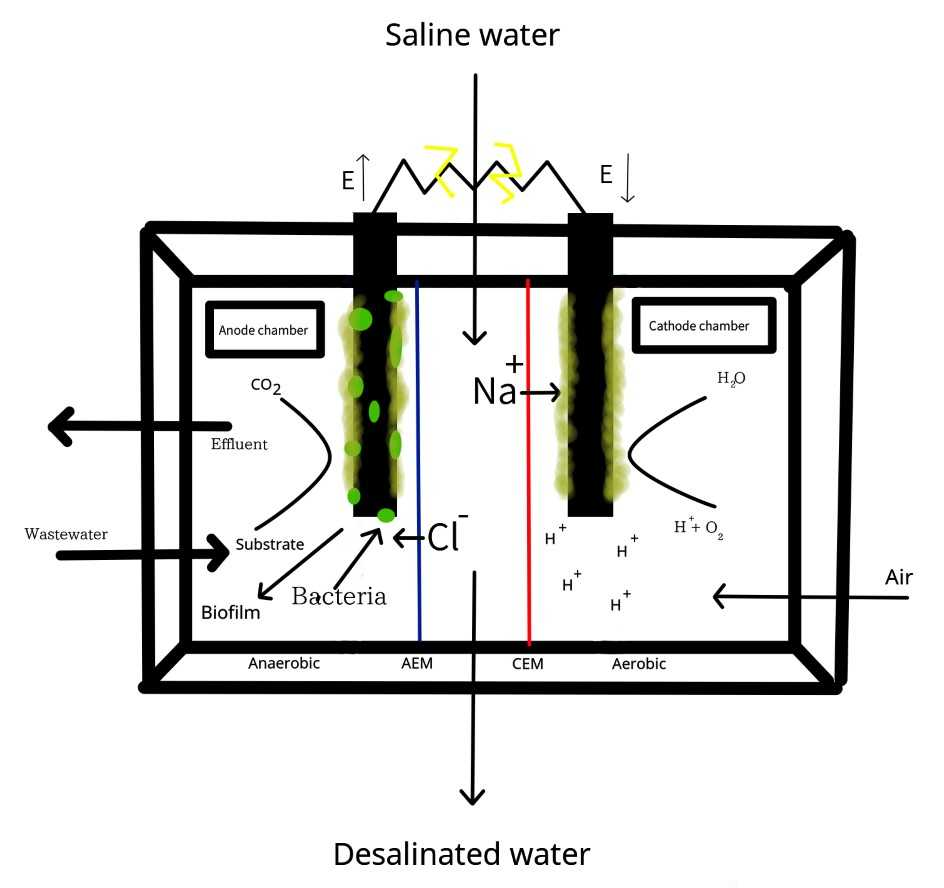
Traditional microbial desalination cell figure consisting of anodic and cathodic chambers, separated by an AEM and CEM. Contains middle desalination chamber.

Increasing agricultural development is associated with the trend of elevated nitrogen concentrations in surrounding soil and groundwater composition due to the runoff of fertilizers and agricultural byproducts. Development of a submerged microbial desalination-denitrification cell (SMDDC) to remove nitrogen and saline from subsurface water alleviates the demand for additional compounds acting as electron donors and instead produces both a net energy and clean, desalinated and denitrified water. In contrast to the typical MDC model, the SMDDC excludes a middle desalination chamber, but instead only contains an anode and cathode chamber separated by a polycarbonate plate and are parallel to the exterior AEM and CEM respectively. Nitrate is introduced through the AEM into the anode chamber through synthetic groundwater, then propagated as an effluent through the external loop to the cathode chamber, in which nitrate is reduced to nitrogen by the cathode and sodium influent. A wastewater feeding tank pumps water to the anodic chamber for subsequent oxidation of sludge by the anodic biofilm. Similar to the original configuration of the MDC, the SMDDC also includes an external circuit in which electrons are thus freed from the oxidation process of the sludge and drove through a closed, external circuit to the cathodic chamber. The toxic and pathogenic content of the wastewater are thus separated simultaneously with the denitrification of the groundwater, producing water that is thus filtered out as a usable effluent. Highest nitrate removal was exhibited when an external voltage (0.8 V) was applied to the circuit, transporting the ions to the anodic chamber and reducing nitrate via heterotrophic denitrification.
