= Minimized extracorporeal circulation =

Minimized extracorporeal circulation (MECC) is a kind of cardiopulmonary bypass (heart-lung machine), a part of heart surgery. The introduction of extracorporeal circulation has facilitated open heart surgery. The development of modern techniques in extracorporeal circulation is the result of the combined efforts of physiologists, physicians, and engineers. During the first half of the 20th century scientists refined their methods in the development of extracorporeal circulation so that it could be used in humans.

In 1937 Gibbon reports the first successful use of extracorporeal circulation in animals (in this case, cats). On May 6, 1953 Gibbon performed his first successful operation using an extracorporeal circuit in an 18-year-old woman who had a large atrial septum defect with a large left-to-right shunt. It was Lillehei who one year later introduced the bubble oxygenator, simple and inexpensive, opening the doors of open heart surgery to all surgeons around the world.

The first commercial minimized extracorporeal circulation was the CorX System from Cardiovention, a start-up company from the USA. This system included an integrated centrifugal pump – polypropylene oxygenator, a complete heparin-coated surface and a low priming volume. One of the most effective Mini-Systems (MECC Maquet) was introduced almost at the same time (1999). The increasing application in clinical practice explains this machine's success. The benefits of this type of extracorporeal circulation are that a lower consumption of blood and blood products is observed in the peri-operative and post-operative phase and that a lower inflammatory response is being measured in peri-operative blood samples in comparison to conventional cardiopulmonary bypass.
