= Full load hour =

Measure of the degree of utilisation

Full Load hour is a measure of the degree of utilisation of a technical system. Full load hours refer to the time for which a plant would have to be operated at nominal power in order to convert the same amount of electrical work as the plant has actually converted within a defined period of time, during which breaks in operation or partial load operation can also occur. The figure usually refers to a period of one calendar year and is mainly applied to power plants.

The annual utilisation rate or capacity factor derived from the number of full-load hours is the relative full-load utilisation in a year, i.e. the number of full-load hours divided by 8760 hours, the number of hours in a year with 365 days.

== Description ==
Typically technical plants are not constantly operated at full load, but depending on various factors (see below) the system can be under a partial load. The total work converted by the plant in a year is therefore less than the maximum possible work in the same period.

The degree of utilisation of a technical plant can be expressed in full load hours if a nominal capacity can be specified and an adequate conversion from partial load operation to nominal load operation exists (e.g. on the basis of the amount of energy or material converted).

The number of full load hours of a plant varies from year to year due to different technical inspection durations, power plant operating schedules, maintenance, unplanned disturbances and outages and due to different weather conditions, especially for renewable energy sources.

The value must not be confused with operating hours. These refer to the entire period of time during which the system has been operated and may include periods of partial load operation.

== Definition ==
The number of full load hours of a generator is calculated by dividing the (expected) annual energy output (e.g. in kWh) by the nominal power of the generator (e.g. in kW or kWp).

$$\text{full load hour} =\frac{kWh}{kWp}=\frac{energy}{power}$$

It indicates how many hours the plant would have run to achieve the same annual energy production if it had been running either at full load or otherwise have been completely inactive.
