= Enzymatic biofuel cell =

An enzymatic biofuel cell is a specific type of fuel cell that uses enzymes as a catalyst to oxidize its fuel, rather than precious metals. Enzymatic biofuel cells, while currently confined to research facilities, are widely prized for the promise they hold in terms of their relatively inexpensive components and fuels, as well as a potential power source for bionic implants.

== Operation ==
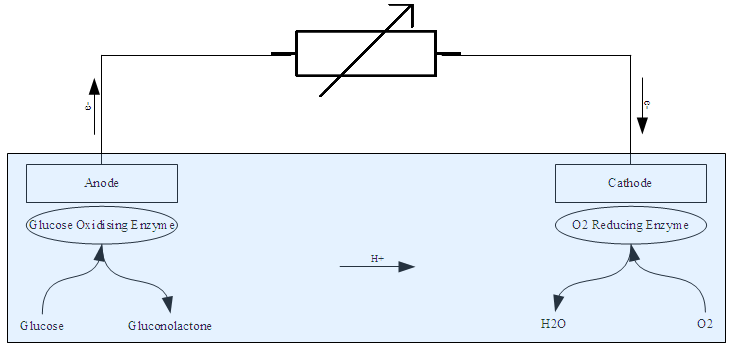
A general diagram for an enzymatic biofuel cell using Glucose and Oxygen. The blue area indicates the electrolyte.

Enzymatic biofuel cells work on the same general principles as all fuel cells: use a catalyst to separate electrons from a parent molecule and force it to go around an electrolyte barrier through a wire to generate an electric current. What makes the enzymatic biofuel cell distinct from more conventional fuel cells are the catalysts they use and the fuels that they accept. Whereas most fuel cells use metals like platinum and nickel as catalysts, the enzymatic biofuel cell uses enzymes derived from living cells (although not within living cells; fuel cells that use whole cells to catalyze fuel are called microbial fuel cells). This offers a couple of advantages for enzymatic biofuel cells: Enzymes are relatively easy to mass-produce and so benefit from economies of scale, whereas precious metals must be mined and so have an inelastic supply. Enzymes are also specifically designed to process organic compounds such as sugars and alcohols, which are extremely common in nature. Most organic compounds cannot be used as fuel by fuel cells with metal catalysts because the carbon monoxide formed by the interaction of the carbon molecules with oxygen during the fuel cell's functioning will quickly “poison” the precious metals that the cell relies on, rendering it useless. Because sugars and other biofuels can be grown and harvested on a massive scale, the fuel for enzymatic biofuel cells is extremely cheap and can be found in nearly any part of the world, thus making it an extraordinarily attractive option from a logistics standpoint, and even more so for those concerned with the adoption of renewable energy sources.

Enzymatic biofuel cells also have operating requirements not shared by traditional fuel cells. What is most significant is that the enzymes that allow the fuel cell to operate must be “immobilized” near the anode and cathode in order to work properly; if not immobilized, the enzymes will diffuse into the cell's fuel and most of the liberated electrons will not reach the electrodes, compromising its effectiveness. Even with immobilization, a means must also be provided for electrons to be transferred to and from the electrodes. This can be done either directly from the enzyme to the electrode (“direct electron transfer”) or with the aid of other chemicals that transfer electrons from the enzyme to the electrode (“mediated electron transfer”). The former technique is possible only with certain types of enzymes whose activation sites are close to the enzyme's surface, but doing so presents fewer toxicity risks for fuel cells intended to be used inside the human body. Finally, completely processing the complex fuels used in enzymatic biofuel cells requires a series of different enzymes for each step of the ‘metabolism’ process; producing some of the required enzymes and maintaining them at the required levels can pose problems.

== History ==
Early work with biofuel cells, which began in the early 20th century, was purely of the microbial variety. Research on using enzymes directly for oxidation in biofuel cells began in the early 1960s, with the first enzymatic biofuel cell being produced in 1964. This research began as a product of NASA's interest in finding ways to recycle human waste into usable energy on board spacecraft, as well as a component of the quest for an artificial heart, specifically as a power source that could be put directly into the human body. These two applications – use of animal or vegetable products as fuel and development of a power source that can be directly implanted into the human body without external refueling – remain the primary goals for developing these biofuel cells. Initial results, however, were disappointing. While the early cells did successfully produce electricity, there was difficulty in transporting the electrons liberated from the glucose fuel to the fuel cell's electrode and further difficulties in keeping the system stable enough to produce electricity at all due to the enzymes’ tendency to move away from where they needed to be in order for the fuel cell to function. These difficulties led to an abandonment by biofuel cell researchers of the enzyme-catalyst model for nearly three decades in favor of the more conventional metal catalysts (principally platinum), which are used in most fuel cells. Research on the subject did not begin again until the 1980s after it was realized that the metallic-catalyst method was not going to be able to deliver the qualities desired in a biofuel cell, and since then work on enzymatic biofuel cells has revolved around the resolution of the various problems that plagued earlier efforts at producing a successful enzymatic biofuel cell.

However, many of these problems were resolved in 1998. In that year, it was announced that researchers had managed to completely oxidize methanol using a series (or "cascade") of enzymes in a biofuel cell. Previous to this time, the enzyme catalysts had failed to completely oxidize the cell's fuel, delivering far lower amounts of energy than what was expected given what was known about the energy capacity of the fuel. While methanol is now far less relevant in this field as a fuel, the demonstrated method of using a series of enzymes to completely oxidize the cell's fuel gave researchers a way forward, and much work is now devoted to using similar methods to achieve complete oxidation of more complicated compounds, such as glucose. In addition, and perhaps what is more important, 1998 was the year in which enzyme “immobilization” was successfully demonstrated, which increased the usable life of the methanol fuel cell from just eight hours to over a week. Immobilization also provided researchers with the ability to put earlier discoveries into practice, in particular the discovery of enzymes that can be used to directly transfer electrons from the enzyme to the electrode. This process had been understood since the 1980s but depended heavily on placing the enzyme as close to the electrode as possible, which meant that it was unusable until after immobilization techniques were devised. In addition, developers of enzymatic biofuel cells have applied some of the advances in nanotechnology to their designs, including the use of carbon nanotubes to immobilize enzymes directly. Other research has gone into exploiting some of the strengths of the enzymatic design to dramatically miniaturize the fuel cells, a process that must occur if these cells are ever to be used with implantable devices. One research team took advantage of the extreme selectivity of the enzymes to completely remove the barrier between anode and cathode, which is an absolute requirement in fuel cells not of the enzymatic type. This allowed the team to produce a fuel cell that produces 1.1 microwatts operating at over half a volt in a space of just 0.01 cubic millimeters.

While enzymatic biofuel cells are not currently in use outside of the laboratory, as the technology has advanced over the past decade non-academic organizations have shown an increasing amount of interest in practical applications for the devices. In 2007, Sony announced that it had developed an enzymatic biofuel cell that can be linked in sequence and used to power an MP3 player, and in 2010 an engineer employed by the US Army announced that the Defense Department was planning to conduct field trials of its own "bio-batteries" in the following year. In explaining their pursuit of the technology, both organizations emphasized the extraordinary abundance (and extraordinarily low expense) of fuel for these cells, a key advantage of the technology that is likely to become even more attractive if the price of portable energy sources goes up, or if they can be successfully integrated into electronic human implants.

== Feasibility of enzymes as catalysts ==
With respect to fuel cells, enzymes have several advantages to their incorporation. An important enzymatic property to consider is the driving force or potential necessary for successful reaction catalysis. Many enzymes operate at potentials close to their substrates which is most suitable for fuel cell applications.

Furthermore, the protein matrix surrounding the active site provides many vital functions; selectivity for the substrate, internal electron coupling, acidic/basic properties and the ability to bind to other proteins (or the electrode). Enzymes are more stable in the absence of proteases, while heat resistant enzymes can be extracted from thermophilic organisms, thus offering a wider range of operational temperatures. Operating conditions is generally between 20 and 50 °C and pH 4.0 to 8.0.

A drawback with the use of enzymes is size; given the large size of enzymes, they yield a low current density per unit electrode area due to the limited space. Since it is not possible to reduce enzyme size, it has been argued that these types of cells will be lower in activity. One solution has been to use three-dimensional electrodes or immobilization on conducting carbon supports which provide high surface area. These electrodes are extended into three-dimensional space which greatly increases the surface area for enzymes to bind thus increasing the current.

== Hydrogenase-based biofuel cells ==
As per the definition of biofuel cells, enzymes are used as electrocatalysts at both the cathode and anode. In hydrogenase-based biofuel cells, hydrogenases are present at the anode for H2 oxidation in which molecular hydrogen is split into electrons and protons. In the case of H2/O2 biofuel cells, the cathode is coated with oxidase enzymes which then convert the protons into water.

=== Hydrogenase as an energy source ===
In recent years, research on hydrogenases has grown significantly due to scientific and technological interest in hydrogen. The bidirectional or reversible reaction catalyzed by hydrogenase is a solution to the challenge in the development of technologies for the capture and storage of renewable energy as fuel with use on demand. This can be demonstrated through the chemical storage of electricity obtained from a renewable source (e.g. solar, wind, hydrothermal) as H_{2} during periods of low energy demands. When energy is desired, H_{2} can be oxidized to produce electricity which is very efficient.

The use of hydrogen in energy converting devices has gained interest due to being a clean energy carrier and potential transportation fuel.

=== Feasibility of hydrogenase as catalysts ===
In addition to the advantages previously mentioned associated with incorporating enzymes in fuel cells, hydrogenase is a very efficient catalyst for H_{2} consumption forming electrons and protons. Platinum is typically the catalyst for this reaction however, the activity of hydrogenases are comparable without the issue of catalyst poisoning by H_{2}S and CO. In the case of H_{2}/O_{2} fuel cells, there is no production of greenhouse gases where the product is water.

With regards to structural advantages, hydrogenase is highly selective for its substrate. The lack of need for a membrane simplifies the biofuel cell design to be small and compact, given that hydrogenase does not react with oxygen (an inhibitor) and the cathode enzymes (typically laccase) does not react with the fuel. The electrodes are preferably made from carbon which is abundant, renewable and can be modified in many ways or adsorb enzymes with high affinity. The hydrogenase is attached to a surface which also extends the lifetime of the enzyme.

=== Challenges ===
There are several difficulties to consider associated with the incorporation of hydrogenase in biofuel cells. These factors must be taken into account to produce an efficient fuel cell.

==== Enzyme immobilization ====
Since the hydrogenase-based biofuel cell hosts a redox reaction, hydrogenase must be immobilized on the electrode in such a way that it can exchange electrons directly with the electrode to facilitate the transfer of electrons. This proves to be a challenge in that the active site of hydrogenase is buried in the center of the enzyme where the FeS clusters are used as an electron relay to exchange electrons with its natural redox partner.

Possible solutions for greater efficiency of electron delivery include the immobilization of hydrogenase with the most exposed FeS cluster close enough to the electrode or the use of a redox mediator to carry out the electron transfer. Direct electron transfer is also possible through the adsorption of the enzyme on graphite electrodes or covalent attachment to the electrode. Another solution includes the entrapment of hydrogenase in a conductive polymer.

==== Enzyme size ====
Immediate comparison of the size of hydrogenase with standard inorganic molecular catalysts reveal that hydrogenase is very bulky. It is approximately 5 nm in diameter compared to 1–5 nm for Pt catalysts. This limits the possible electrode coverage by capping the maximum current density.

Since altering the size of hydrogenase is not a possibility, to increase the density of enzyme present on the electrode to maintain fuel cell activity, a porous electrode can be used instead of one that is planar. This increases the electroactive area allowing more enzyme to be loaded onto the electrode. An alternative is to form films with graphite particles adsorbed with hydrogenase inside a polymer matrix. The graphite particles then can collect and transport electrons to the electrode surface.

==== Oxidative damage ====
In a biofuel cell, hydrogenase is exposed to two oxidizing threats. O_{2} inactivates most hydrogenases with the exception of [NiFe] through diffusion of O_{2} to the active site followed by destructive modification of the active site. O_{2} is the fuel at the cathode and therefore must be physically separated or else the hydrogenase enzymes at the anode would be inactivated. Secondly, there is a positive potential imposed on hydrogenase at the anode by the enzyme on the cathode. This further enhances the inactivation of hydrogenase by O_{2} causing even [NiFe] which was previously O2-tolerant, to be affected.

To avoid inactivation by O_{2}, a proton exchange membrane can be used to separate the anode and cathode compartments such that O_{2} is unable to diffuse to and destructively modify the active site of hydrogenase.

=== Applications ===
==== Entrapment of hydrogenase in polymers ====
There are many ways to adsorb hydrogenases onto carbon electrodes that have been modified with polymers. An example is a study done by Morozov et al. where they inserted NiFe hydrogenase into polypyrrole films and to provide proper contact to the electrode, there were redox mediators entrapped into the film. This was successful because the hydrogenase density was high in the films and the redox mediator helped to connect all enzyme molecules for catalysis which was about the same power output as hydrogenase in solution.

==== Immobilizing hydrogenase on carbon nanotubes ====
Carbon nanotubes can also be used for a support for hydrogenase on the electrode due to their ability to assemble in large porous and conductive networks. These hybrids have been prepared using [FeFe] and [NiFe] hydrogenases. The [NiFe] hydrogenase isolated from A. aeolicus (thermophilic bacteria) was able to oxidize H_{2} with direct electron transfer without a redox mediator with a 10-fold higher catalytic current with stationary CNT-coated electrodes than with bare electrodes.

Another way of coupling hydrogenase to the nanotubes was to covalently bind them to avoid a time delay. Hydrogenase isolated from D. gigas (jumbo squid) was coupled to multiwalled carbon nanotube (MWCNT) networks and produced a current ~30 times higher than the graphite-hydrogenase anode. A slight drawback to this method is that the ratio of hydrogenase covering the surface of the nanotube network leaves hydrogenase to cover only the scarce defective spots in the network. It is also found that some adsorption procedures tend to damage the enzymes whereas covalently coupling them stabilized the enzyme and allows it to remain stable for longer. The catalytic activity of hydrogenase-MWCNT electrodes provided stability for over a month whereas the hydrogenase-graphite electrodes only lasted about a week.

==== Hydrogenase-based biofuel cell applications ====
A fully enzymatic hydrogen fuel cell was constructed by the Armstrong group who used the cell to power a watch. The fuel cell consisted of a graphite anode with hydrogenase isolated from R. metallidurans and a graphite cathode modified with fungal laccase. The electrodes were placed in a single chamber with a mixture of 3% H_{2} gas in air and there was no membrane due to the tolerance of the hydrogenase to oxygen. The fuel cell produced a voltage of 950mV and generated 5.2 uW/cm^{2} of electricity. Although this system was very functional, it was still not at optimum output due to the low accessible H_{2} levels, the lower catalytic activity of the oxygen tolerant hydrogenases and the lower density of catalysts on the flat electrodes.

This system was then later improved by adding a MWCNT network to increase the electrode area.

== Applications ==
=== Self-powered biosensors ===
The beginning concept of applying enzymatic biofuel cells for self-powered biosensing applications has been introduced since 2001. With continued efforts, several types of self-powered enzyme-based biosensors have been demonstrated. In 2016, the first example of stretchable textile-based biofuel cells, acting as wearable self-powered sensors, was described. The smart textile device utilized a lactate oxidase-based biofuel cell, allowing real-time monitoring of lactate in sweat for on-body applications.

== See also ==
- Bioelectrochemical reactor
- Biobattery
- Electrochemical reduction of carbon dioxide
- Electromethanogenesis
- Microbial fuel cell
