= Electrochemical engineering =

Branch of chemical engineering

Electrochemical engineering is the branch of chemical engineering dealing with the technological applications of electrochemical phenomena, such as electrosynthesis of chemicals, electrowinning and refining of metals, flow batteries and fuel cells, surface modification by electrodeposition, electrochemical separations and corrosion, gas compression (electrochemical hydrogen compressor).

According to the IUPAC, the term electrochemical engineering is reserved for electricity-intensive processes for industrial or energy storage applications and should not be confused with applied electrochemistry, which comprises small batteries, amperometric sensors, microfluidic devices, microelectrodes, solid-state devices, voltammetry at disc electrodes, etc.

More than 6% of the electricity is consumed by large-scale electrochemical operations in the US.

== Scope ==
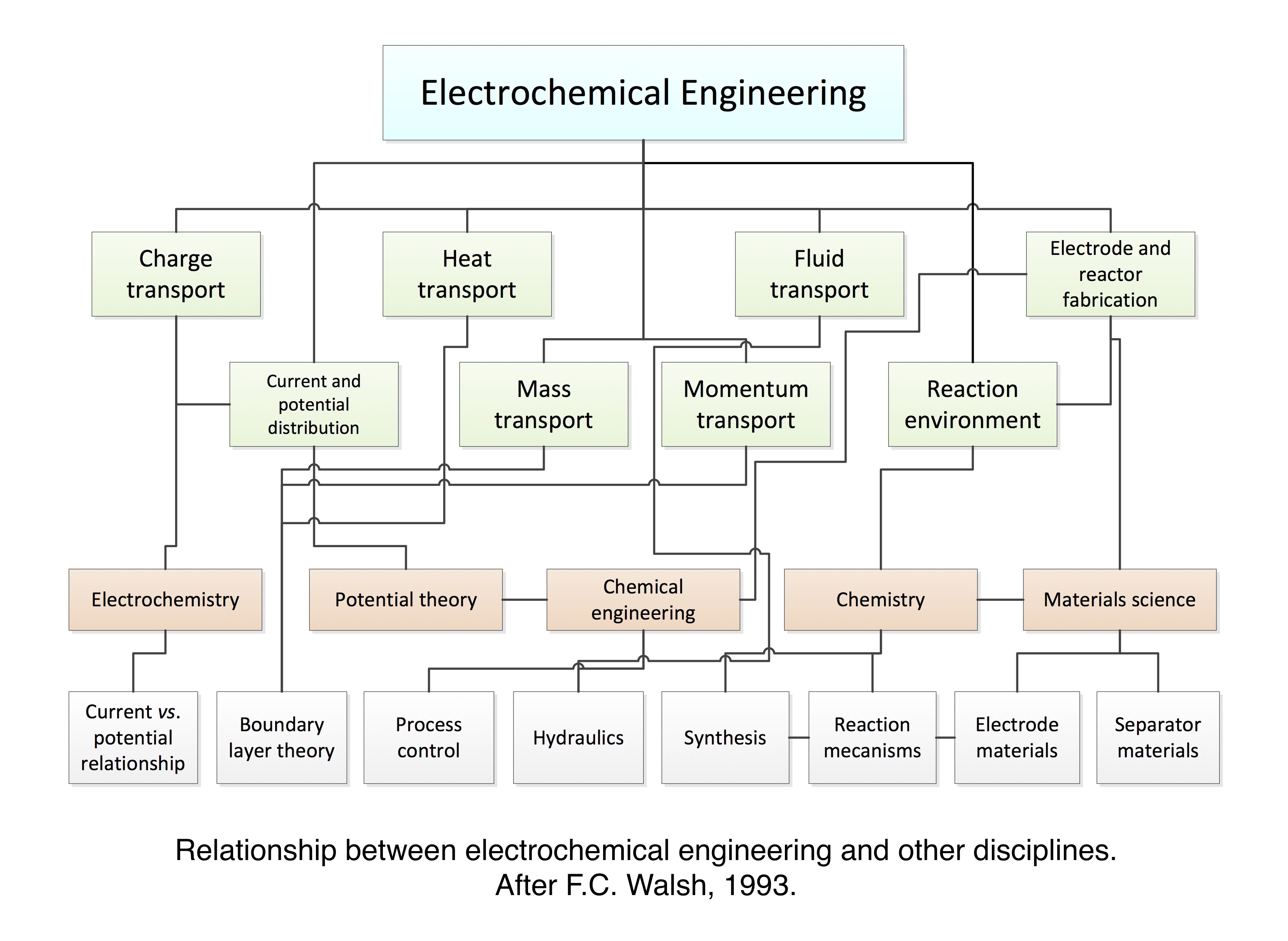
This diagram shows the relationship between electrochemical engineering and other disciplines.

Electrochemical engineering combines the study of heterogeneous charge transfer at electrode/electrolyte interphases with the development of practical materials and processes. Fundamental considerations include electrode materials and the kinetics of redox species. The development of the technology involves the study of the electrochemical reactors, their potential and current distribution, mass transport conditions, hydrodynamics, geometry and components as well as the quantification of its overall performance in terms of reaction yield, conversion efficiency, and energy efficiency. Industrial developments require further reactor and process design, fabrication methods, testing, and product development.

Electrochemical engineering considers current distribution, fluid flow, mass transfer, and the kinetics of the electro reactions to design efficient electrochemical reactors.

Most electrochemical operations are performed in filter-press reactors with parallel plate electrodes or, less often, in stirred tanks with rotating cylinder electrodes. Fuel cell and flow battery stacks are types of filter-press reactors. Most of them are continuous operations.

== History ==
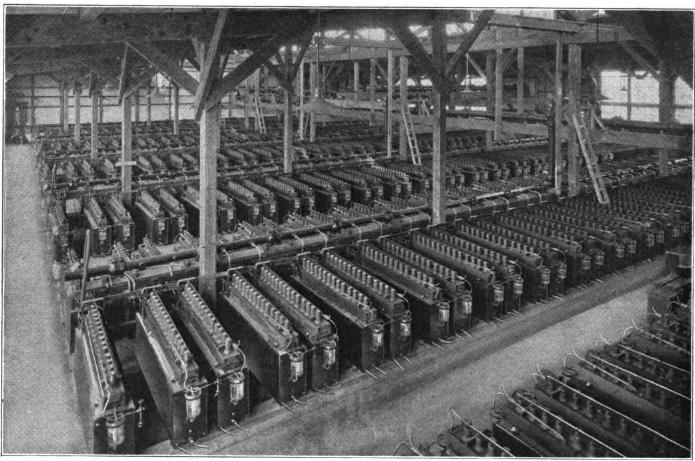
Cell room of a chlor-alkali plant ca. 1920

This branch of engineering emerged gradually from chemical engineering as electrical power sources became available in the mid-19th century. Michael Faraday described his laws of electrolysis in 1833, relating for the first time the amount of electrical charge and converted mass. In 1886 Charles Martin Hall developed a cheap electrochemical process for extracting aluminium from its ore in molten salts, constituting the first true large-scale electrochemical industry. Later, Hamilton Castner improved the aluminium manufacturing process and devised the electrolysis of brine in large mercury cells for the production of chlorine and caustic soda, effectively founding the chlor-alkali industry with Karl Kellner in 1892. The next year, Paul L. Hulin patented filter-press type electrochemical cells in France. Charles Frederick Burgess developed the electrolytic refining of iron ca. 1904 and later ran a successful battery company. Burgess published one of the first texts on the field in 1920. Industrial electrochemistry followed an empirical approach during the first three decades of the 20th century.

After the Second World War, interest focused on the fundaments of electrochemical reactions. Among other developments, the potentiostat (1937) enabled such studies. A critical advance was provided by the work of Carl Wagner and Veniamin Levich in 1962, who linked the hydrodynamics of a flowing electrolyte towards a rotating disc electrode with the mass transport control of the electrochemical reaction through a rigorous mathematical treatment. The same year, Wagner described "The Scope of Electrochemical Engineering" for the first time as a separate discipline from a physicochemical perspective. During the 60s and 70s Charles W. Tobias, who is regarded as the "father of electrochemical engineering" by the Electrochemical Society, was concerned with ionic transport by diffusion, migration, and convection, exact solutions of potential and current distribution problems, conductance in heterogeneous media, quantitative description of processes in porous electrodes. Also in the 60s, John Newman pioneered the study of many of the physicochemical laws that govern electrochemical systems, demonstrating how complex electrochemical processes could be analysed mathematically to correctly formulate and solve problems associated with batteries, fuel cells, electrolyzer, and related technologies. In Switzerland, Norbert Ibl contributed to experimental and theoretical studies of mass transfer and potential distribution in electrolyses, especially at porous electrodes. Fumio Hine carried out equivalent developments in Japan. In addition, several individuals, including Kuhn, Kreysa, Rousar, Fleischmann, Alkire, Coeuret, Pletcher, and Walsh established many other training centers and, with their colleagues, developed important experimental and theoretical methods of study. Currently, the main tasks of electrochemical engineering consist of the development of efficient, safe, and sustainable technologies for the production of chemicals, metal recovery, remediation, and decontamination technologies as well as the design of fuel cells, flow batteries, and industrial electrochemical reactors.

The history of electrochemical engineering has been summarised by Wendt, Lapicque, and Stankovic.

== Applications ==
Electrochemical engineering is applied in industrial water electrolysis, electrolysis, electrosynthesis, electroplating, fuel cells, flow batteries, decontamination of industrial effluents, electrorefining, electrowinning, etc. The primary example of an electrolysis-based process is the Chloralkali process for caustic soda and chlorine production. Other inorganic chemicals produced by electrolysis include:

- Ammonium persulfate
- Chlorine
- Electrowinning
- Fluorine
- Hydrogen peroxide
- Manganese dioxide
- Ozone
- Potassium dichromate
- Potassium permanganate
- Sodium chlorate
- Sodium hypochlorite
- Sodium persulfate
- Silver nitrate
- White lead (Basic lead carbonate)

== Conventions ==
The established performance criteria, definitions, and nomenclature for electrochemical engineering can be found in Kreysa et al. and an IUPAC report.

== Awards ==
- Castner Medal
- Carl Wagner Medal
- Vittorio de Nora Award

== See also ==
- Chloralkali process
- Electrochemical cell
- Electrochemical energy conversion
- Electrodeionization
- Electrodialysis
- Electrofiltration
- Flow battery
- Fuel cell
- Galvanic cell
- Isotope electrochemistry
- Magnetoelectrochemistry
- Photoelectrochemistry

== Bibliography ==
- T.F. Fuller, John N. Harb, Electrochemical Engineering, John Wiley & Sons, 2018.
- H. Wright (ed.), Electrochemical Engineering: Emerging Technologies and Applications, Willford Press, 2016.
- D. Stolten, B. Emonts, Fuel Cell Science and Engineering: Materials, Processes, Systems and Technology, John Wiley & Sons, 2012.
- D.D. Macdonald, P. Schmuki (eds.), Electrochemical Engineering, in Encyclopedia of Electrochemistry, Vol. 5, Wiley-VCH, 2007.
- J. Newman, K.E. Thomas-Alyea, Electrochemical Systems, 3rd ed., John Wiley & Sons, Hoboken NJ, 2004. (1st ed. 1973).
- V.M. Schmidt, Elektrochemische Verfahrenstechnik, Wiley-VCH, 2003.
- H. Pütter, Industrial Electroorganic Chemistry, in Organic Electrochemistry, 4th ed., H. Lund, O. Hammerich (eds.), Marcel Dekker, New York, 2001.
- F.C. Walsh, Un Primer Curso de Ingeniería Electroquímica, Editorial Club Universitario, Alicante, España, 2000.
- M.P. Grotheer, Electrochemical Processing, Inorganic, in Kirk-Othmer Encyclopedia of Chemical Technology, 5th ed., Vol. 9, P. 618, John Wiley & Sons, 2000.
- H. Wendt, G. Kreysa, Electrochemical Engineering: Science and Technology in Chemical and Other Industries, Springer, Berlin 1999.
- R.F. Savinell, Tutorials in Electrochemical Engineering - Mathematical Modeling, Pennington, The Electrochemical Society, 1999.
- A. Geoffrey, Electrochemical Engineering Principles, Prentice Hall, 1997.
- F. Goodrige, K. Scott Electrochemical Process Engineering - A Guide to the Design of Electrolytic Plant, Plenum Press, New York & London, 1995.
- J. Newman, R.E. White (eds.), Proceedings of the Douglas N. Bennon Memorial Symposium. Topics in Electrochemical Engineering, The Electrochemical Society, Proceedings Vol. 94-22, 1994.
- F. Lapicque, A. Storck, A.A. Wragg, Electrochemical Engineering and Energy, Springer, 1994.
- F.C. Walsh, A First Course in Electrochemical Engineering, The Electrochemical Consultancy, Romsey UK, 1993.
- F. Coeuret, A. Storck, Eléments de Génie Électrochimique, 2nd ed., Éditions TEC et DOC / Lavoisier, Paris, 1993. (1st ed. 1984)
- F. Coeuret, Introducción a la Ingeniería Electroquímica, Editorial Reverté, Barcelona, 1992.
- K. Scott, Electrochemical Reaction Engineering, Academic Press, London, 1991.
- G. Prentice, Electrochemical Engineering Principles, Prentice Hall, 1991.
- D. Pletcher, F.C. Walsh, Industrial Electrochemistry, 2nd ed., Chapman and Hall, London, 1990.
- J.D. Genders, D. Pletcher, Electrosynthesis - From Laboratory, to Pilot, to Production, The Electrosynthesis Company, New York, 1990.
- M.I. Ismail, Electrochemical Reactors Their Science and Technology - Part A: Fundamentals, Electrolysers, Batteries, and Fuel Cells, Elsevier, Amsterdam, 1989.
- T.R. Beck, Industrial Electrochemical Processes, in Techniques of Electrochemistry, E. Yeager, A.J. Salkind (eds.), Wiley, New York, 1987.
- E. Heitz, G. Kreysa, Principles of Electrochemical Engineering, John Wiley & Sons, 1986.
- I. Roušar, A. Kimla, K. Micka, Electrochemical Engineering, Elsevier, Amsterdam, 1986.
- T.Z. Fahidy, Principles of Electrochemical Reactor Analysis, Elsevier, Amsterdam, 1985.
- F. Hine, Electrode Processes and Electrochemical Engineering, Springer, Boston, 1985.
- R.E. White, (ed.), Electrochemical Cell Design, Springer, 1984.
- P. Horsman, B.E. Conway, S. Sarangapani (eds.), Comprehensive Treatise of Electrochemistry. Vol. 6 Electrodics: Transport, Plenum Press, New York, 1983.
- D. Pletcher, Industrial Electrochemistry, 1st ed., Chapman and Hall, London, 1982.
- J.O’M. Bockris, B.E. Conway, E. Yeager, R.E. White, (eds.) Comprehensive Treatise of Electrochemistry. Vol. 2: Electrochemical Processing, Plenum Press, New York, 1981.
- D.J. Pickett, Electrochemical Reactor Design, 2nd ed., Elsevier, Amsterdam, 1979.
- P. Gallone, Trattato di Ingegneria Elettrochimica, Tamburini, Milan, 1973.
- A. Kuhn, Industrial Electrochemical Processes, Elsevier, Amsterdam, 1971.
- C.L. Mantell, Electrochemical Engineering, 4th ed., McGraw-Hill, New York, 1960.
- C.L. Mantell, Industrial Electrochemistry, 2nd ed., McGraw-Hill, New York, 1940.
- C.F. Burgess, H.B. Pulsifer, B.B. Freud, Applied Electrochemistry and Metallurgy, American Technical Society, Chicago, 1920.
- A.J. Hale, The Manufacture of Chemicals by Electrolysis, Van Nostrand Co., New York, 1919.
