= Neu-Salems-Gesellschaft =

German religious group

The Neu-Salems-Gesellschaft (German for: New Salems Society) is a neo-revelationist group named after the publishing house Neu-Salems-Verlag, located in Bietigheim-Bissingen, Germany. Without much organization or membership it was a name for the followers of Jakob Lorber and readers of the books from this publisher. The society existed from 1921 until 1937 when it was prohibited by the National Socialists. After World War II the society congregated again as Lorber-Gesellschaft (German for: Lorber Society).

The Neu-Salems-Gesellschaft saw itself as nondenominational and international part of the "world community of the religions of love", spiritually related to the Quakers, The Salvation Army (mainly because of the active love), New Thought movement, the Baháʼí Faith, the Bhakti movement of Hinduism, as well as Daoyuan and Oomoto. Main elements of the society were inner freedom and independence connected with deep religiosity, as well as the belief in the divine authorship of the new revelation of Jakob Lorber. The society saw itself as Christian, whose foundation is the Bible, which is understood, interpreted and completed through new revelations.
