= Bertha Dudde =

German dressmaker and mystic (1891–1965)

- Born: 1 April 1891; Liegnitz, Germany (now Poland)
- Died: 18 September 1965 (aged 74); Leverkusen, Germany
- Occupation(s): Dressmaker; Mystic

Bertha Dudde (1 April 1891, Liegnitz, Silesia, today Legnica – 18 September 1965, Leverkusen) was a German dressmaker who, by her own account, received "revelations through her inner voice" and wrote them down. The resulting work of over 9,000 consecutively numbered, dated, handwritten individual revelations on various topics was compiled into collections of writings and translated into other languages.

== Life and work ==
From her autobiography: Bertha Dudde grew up with six siblings as the second eldest daughter of a painter in poor circumstances. She only enjoyed the usual elementary school education of the time and practiced her penchant for tailoring at an early age in order to support the family financially. She pursued this activity into old age in order to earn her own living.

Her parents belonged to different Christian denominations and raised their children with relative religious freedom. She therefore had hardly any denominational knowledge worth mentioning, as she kept herself away from church influence because she was opposed to these teachings. She wrote that she first perceived an inner voice on July 15, 1937: "I prayed and paid attention to my inner self - I remained completely still - I often remained in this state, because a wonderful peace always came over me, and thoughts that I felt - in the heart area, not in my head - gave me comfort and strength."

By the time of her death in 1965, she had written around 9,030 texts. She only became known to a wider readership more recently. The work continues to be translated into various languages. Translations are available for download in English, French, Dutch, Spanish, Croatian, Polish, Greek, Russian, Romanian and Korean (as of 2022).

The Kundgaben texts claim to be of divine origin and are attributed by their proponents to the New Revelations, to which the partly related work Jakob Lorbers also belongs. The world view from the totality of the proclamations develops a far-reaching, clearly Christocentric world view, but deviates from the propagated one of traditional Christianity.

== Criticism ==
Critics see Gnostic, Buddhist and Hindu colorations in details of the contents. Critics doubt its claim to be a revelation of divine origin. They accuse her of lacking concreteness, similarities to prophecies of other seers and, in part, existential contradictions to the Bible. In her work, Dudde also cites numerous "explanations" on scientific issues, especially astronomy. However, these often do not stand up to closer scientific scrutiny; for example, the gas planet Saturn is described as a planet made of transparent metal and it is claimed that other stars could not exist without the Sun.

== Further sources ==
- Eggenberger, Oswald (1994). Die Kirchen, Sondergruppen und religiösen Vereinigungen. Theologischer Verlag. ISBN 9783290116392.
- Patrick, Diemling (2012). Neuoffenbarungen. Universitätsverlag Potsdam. ISBN 9783869562094.
