= Great Gospel of John =

Neo-revelationist text by Jakob Lorber

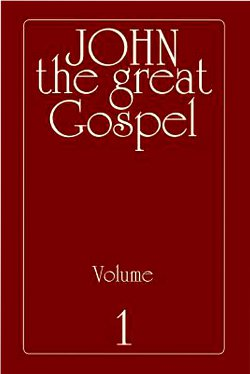
John the great Gospel, 2011

The Great Gospel of John (in the original German published as Das große Evangelium Johannis or Großes Evangelium Johannes) is a neo-revelationist text by Jakob Lorber, extending to about 5,500 pages in print, published in ten volumes. It is the major work of Lorber's "New Revelation" based on interior locution. It was written in Austria, in the town Graz, from August 1851 until July 1864.

Leopold Engel in 1891 wrote an addendum in an "11th volume", purportedly also based on interior locution. Supporters of the authenticity of Lorber's revelation are divided as to the authenticity of Engel's.

The Great Gospel is a detailed first-person narrative of Jesus' last three years of ministry on Earth. It is a day by day account of his miracles, healings, and conversations. It is built on the same structure of the original Gospel of John. Love and works of love are emphasised.

Whereas some of the chapters in the biblical book of John are not covered at all, other sections are added and in much detail. Pharisees are for example revealed to be extremely dangerous, continually plotting against Jesus even though he often forgave them; at one point, a Pharisaical plot to steal from the Romans is revealed, and at their trial Jesus, whose reputation for keen wisdom is known to the Romans by this time, is consulted. The Roman centurion is willing to execute the Pharisees because of their attempt to bribe him, yet Jesus says to let them go, after dividing their plunder: one third to Rome, one-third to the centurion's local needs, and one-third to the poor people of the nearby communities, some of whose children had been kidnapped by the Pharisees, to be sold as slaves.

== Theology and Religious practice ==
=== Concept of God ===
Lorber does not reveal Jesus as one of three separate divine persons in a holy Trinity according to teachings of the main Christian churches. Like man, who has been created totally in God's image, God consists of three different persons - body, soul and spirit - each with his own individual activity, but nevertheless man is only one human being. Likewise Jesus is the only one divine being existing in himself eternally out of a well distinguishable trinity. The Father, Jesus as son and the Holy spirit are distinguishable one and the same from eternity. The father in Jesus is everlasting love. Jesus as the son is light and wisdom, the word of God, which emanates from the fire of everlasting love. The Holy Spirit in God is the will of God, the great pronounced word 'It shall be!' This all is in Jesus: the love, the wisdom and the power. Only one God exists, and this is Jesus, who only took a body on earth, to reveal himself better to the people of the earth.

=== Relationship to God ===
In chapter 59 of the first book of the Great Gospel of John, it is described how Jesus corrects a God-fearing man, by telling him it is not right for him to have fear of God as what God wants is love. In future he should love God more than fear Him. In chapter 58 of the second book of the Great Gospel of John verse 3, the angel explains that one should speak to God as if He was one's equal. The highest spiritual perfection in this world, or in the afterlife, is to become boundlessly free, a perfect person, a child of God, one with God and doing what God is doing. The children of God must be perfect, just as God as their true Father Himself is perfect. This is achieved by loving God above all else, and the neighbor as oneself with all patience and with all strength, either in this world or at least in the other world.

=== Salvation ===
In chapter 10:17 of the first book of the Great Gospel of John, Lorber explains the gospel of salvation as three steps. Firstly a person needs to master his flesh. Secondly he needs to purify his soul through works of love. Thirdly a person's spirit needs to be awakened from the grave of judgement. These three steps are described as the process of rebirth. In chapter 18:8 the Lord is described to explain to Nicodemus that to be born of water means to be born of humility, and only then by the Spirit of Truth, which is described to be impossible to be received by an impure spirit. This is how entry to the kingdom of God is described to be made possible.

In chapter 62 of the first book of the Great Gospel of John, the mission of Jesus on Earth is described as to invite those from darkness to the Kingdom of love (via his message of love). Verse 9 describes that up to date, not one soul could, when she left her body, loose herself from the earth and that countless suffer in the night of the earth. It is described that when Jesus ascends to heaven he will open the heavens and in exactly the same way every person will enter eternal life. It is described that this is the task of universal reconciliation which the Messiah has to accomplish and absolutely nothing else. Jesus came to Earth, according to Lorber's writings, to bring people to the right path, through friendly and loving teaching. ("Great gospel of John V11 188:11) The 'Great Gospel' does not place emphasis on the crucifixion of Christ, nor on the blood of Jesus for the atonement of sin, but emphasises the teaching of love and its adherence by followers as means to salvation.

=== Cult and laws ===
In chapter 23:6 of the first book of the Great Gospel of John, it is explained that only one thing is necessary, and that is to adhere to the teaching of Jesus. Baptism is described as a type of washing, that has some benefits and it is described that after Jesus's teaching many went to be baptised by John.

In chapter 26 of the second book of the Great Gospel of John, it is elaborated how the law of Moses is to be kept. There is no differentiation made in Lorber's writings between an Old Covenant and a New Covenant.

In the Great Gospel of John, book three chapter 215 verse 2, it is explained how sex should never be engaged in for the pleasant feelings associated with it, but always only to produce an offspring.

In chapter 242 of the first book (verse 10 and 13) of the Great Gospel of John, it is preached that certain food should be avoided for health reasons. Such foods includes unripe fruits, potatoes and coffee. But then what one eats or drinks for the necessary strengthening of the body, will not make him either blessed nor unblessed.

== Editions ==
The Evangelium Johannis was published posthumously from 1871 to 1876 in 7 volumes by Johannes Busch, a publisher from Dresden (Germany). Later it was numbered and published in ten volumes and divided into chapters by C. F. Landbeck, Neu-theosophischer Verlag and Neu-Salems-Verlag. Currently it is published by the Lorber-Verlag, a dedicated publisher based in Bietigheim-Bissingen, Germany. Engel's addendum was published by C. F. Landbeck and Lorber Verlag as volume 11. The 1st edition dates to 1871; the 8th edition to 1996.

An abbreviated English translation in six volumes has appeared with Merkur Publishing.

Since 2011 a full translation (10 volumes) of the Great Gospel of John, called John the Great Gospel, is available from CreateSpace, Amazon.com.

== Reception ==
E. F. Schumacher wrote about the ten big books of the Great Gospel: "(They) contain many strange things which are unacceptable to the modern mentality, but at the same time such a plethora of high wisdom and insight that it would be difficult to find anything more impressive in the whole of world literature."

Karlheinz Stockhausen set portions of Volume 3 to music in Sirius.

== See also ==
- List of Gospels
