= Carl Kellner (mystic) =

Austrian chemist, inventor, industrialist, Ordo Templi Orientis founder

- Born: 1 September 1851; Vienna, Austrian Empire
- Died: 7 June 1905 (aged 53); Vienna, Austria-Hungary

Carl Kellner (1 September 1851 – June 7, 1905) was a chemist, inventor, and industrialist. Born in Vienna, Austria, he made significant improvements to the sulfite process and was co-inventor of the Castner-Kellner process.

He was a student of Freemasonry, Rosicrucianism, and Eastern mysticism. He was the putative founder of Ordo Templi Orientis and is sometimes referred to as "Spiritual father of O.T.O.".

== Career ==
Carl Kellner is reputed to have developed the Ritter-Kellner process while working for Baron Hector Von Ritter-Zahony in 1876. In 1889 he established the Kellner-Partington paper pulp Co in association with Edward Partington.

The process for making caustic soda and chlorine by electrolysis of brine using a mercury electrode was developed independently by Mr Hamilton Y. Castner and Dr Carl Kellner in 1892. They established the Castner Kellner company jointly to exploit their patents in 1895.

It is not known when he obtained his doctorate but he used the title of PhD from 1895.

== Freemasonry and esotericism ==
Kellner had become a Freemason in 1873, being initiated at the Humanitas Lodge on the Austro-Hungarian border, taking the motto of Brother Renatus. In 1885, Kellner met the Theosophical and Rosicrucian scholar, Dr. Franz Hartmann (1838–1912). He and Hartmann later collaborated on the development of the "ligno-sulphite" inhalation therapy for tuberculosis, which formed the basis of treatment at Hartmann's sanitarium near Saltzburg. During this period, Kellner became interested in the more esoteric aspects of Freemasonry, joining John Yarker's Rite of Memphis-Misraim.

During extensive travels in Europe, America, and Asia Minor, Kellner claimed to have come into contact with three adepts (a Sufi, Soliman ben Aifa, and two Hindu Tantrics, Bhima Sena Pratapa of Lahore and Sri Mahatma Agamya Paramahamsa), and an organization called the Hermetic Brotherhood of Light. These adepts are attributed with having initiated Kellner into the use of sexual magick (sometimes referred to as 'the sexual current' by ritual magicians). Kellner was also influenced by French followers of the American occultist Paschal Beverly Randolph.

During the course of his esoteric studies, Kellner believed that he had discovered a "key" which offered a clear explanation of all the complex symbolism of Freemasonry, and, Kellner believed, opened the mysteries of nature. Kellner developed a desire to form an Academia Masonica which would enable Freemasons to become familiar with all existing Masonic degrees and systems.

== Ordo Templi Orientis ==
In 1895, Kellner began to discuss his idea for founding this Academia Masonica with his associate Theodor Reuss (aka Frater Merlin or Peregrinus). During these discussions, Kellner decided that the Academia Masonica should be called Ordo Templi Orientis (Oriental Templar Order). The occult inner circle of this order (O.T.O. proper) would be organized parallel to the highest degrees of the Rite of Memphis-Misraim and would teach the esoteric Rosicrucian doctrines of the Hermetic Brotherhood of Light, and Kellner's "key" to Masonic symbolism. Both men and women would be admitted at all levels to this order, but possession of the various degrees of Craft and high-grade Freemasonry would be a prerequisite for admission to the inner circle of O.T.O.

Due to the regulations of the established grand lodges which governed Regular Masonry, women could not be made Masons and would therefore be excluded by default from membership in Ordo Templi Orientis. Reforming the Masonic system to allow the admission of women may have been one of the reasons that Kellner and his associates resolved to obtain control over one of the many rites of Masonry; possibly because of wishing to incorporate the practice of sex magic. They may have believed that sex magic was "...the key to all the secrets of the universe and to all the symbolism ever used by secret societies and religions."

The discussions between Reuss and Kellner did not lead to any positive results at the time, because Reuss was very busy with a revival of the Order of Illuminati along with his associate Leopold Engel of Dresden. Kellner did not approve of the revived Illuminati Order or of Engel. According to Reuss, upon his final separation with Engel in June 1902, Kellner contacted him and the two agreed to proceed with the establishment of Ordo Templi Orientis by seeking authorizations to work the various rites of high-grade Masonry. Reuss and Kellner together prepared a brief manifesto for their order in 1903, which was published the next year in The Oriflamme. However whether Kellner ever lived to see O.T.O. becoming more than just these early plans is debatable, since he died in 1905, not long after the first announcements were made.

== Illness and death ==
In 1903 Kellner mysteriously took ill and, after a long hospital stay, went to Cairo's dry climate to recuperate during the winter of 1904–05. He returned to Vienna and work in seemingly good health, but on June 7, 1905, he suffered a fatal heart attack. The coroner cited "chronic poisoning, due to infection of the blood" as the case of death. He left his widow, Maria, and four children, Elga, Nora, Edi and Widi.

== See also ==
- Members of Ordo Templi Orientis
