= Castner–Kellner process =

Method of electrolysis of alkali chloride solutions

The Castner–Kellner process is a method of electrolysis on an aqueous alkali chloride solution (usually sodium chloride solution occurring in abundance in nature in the form of brine) to produce the corresponding alkali hydroxide, invented by American Hamilton Castner and Austrian Carl Kellner in the 1890s. It is a type of chloralkali process, but in this role it is gradually being replaced by membrane electrolysis which has lower energy cost and fewer environmental concerns.

== History ==
The first patent for electrolyzing brine was granted in England in 1851 to Charles Watt. His process was not an economically feasible method for producing sodium hydroxide though because it could not prevent the chlorine that formed in the brine solution from reacting with its other constituents. American chemist and engineer, Hamilton Castner, solved the mixing problem with the invention of the mercury cell and was granted a U.S. patent in 1894. Austrian chemist, Carl Kellner arrived at a similar solution at about the same time. In order to avoid a legal battle they became partners in 1895, founding the Castner-Kellner Alkali Company, which built plants employing the process throughout Europe. The mercury cell process continues in use to this day. Current-day mercury cell plant operations are criticized for environmental release of mercury leading in some cases to severe mercury poisoning (as occurred in Japan). Due to these concerns, mercury cell plants are being phased out, and a sustained effort is being made to reduce mercury emissions from existing plants.

== Process details ==
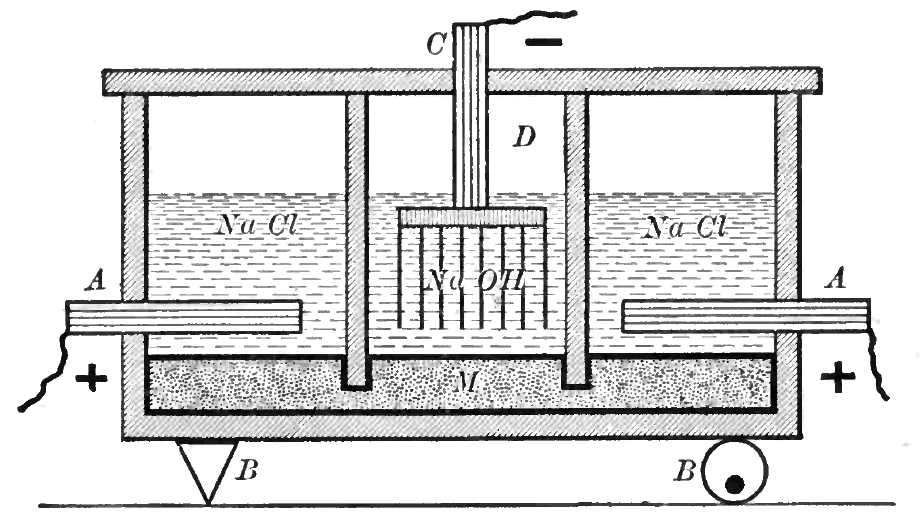
Castner–Kellner apparatus

The apparatus shown is divided into two types of cells separated by slate walls. The first type, shown on the right and left of the diagram, uses an electrolyte of sodium chloride solution, a graphite anode (A), and a mercury cathode (M). The other type of cell, shown in the center of the diagram, uses an electrolyte of sodium hydroxide solution, a mercury anode (M), and an iron cathode (D). The mercury electrode is common between the two cells and serves as anode in one cell and as cathode in the other. This is achieved by having the walls separating the cells dip below the level of the electrolytes but still allow the mercury to flow beneath them.

The reaction at anode (A) is:

2 Cl^{−} → Cl_{2} + 2 e^{−}

The chlorine gas that results vents at the top of the outside cells where it is collected as a byproduct of the process. The reaction at the mercury cathode in the outer cells is

Na^{+} + e^{−} → Na (amalgam)

The sodium metal formed by this reaction dissolves in the mercury to form an amalgam. The mercury conducts the current from the outside cells to the center cell. In addition, a rocking mechanism (B shown by fulcrum on the left and rotating eccentric on the right) agitates the mercury to transport the dissolved sodium metal from the outside cells to the center cell.

The anode reaction in the center cell takes place at the interface between the mercury and the sodium hydroxide solution.

2Na (amalgam) → 2Na^{+} + 2e^{−}

Finally at the iron cathode (D) of the center cell the reaction is

2H_{2}O + 2e^{−} → 2OH^{−} + H_{2}

The net effect is that the concentration of sodium chloride in the outside cells decreases and the concentration of sodium hydroxide in the center cell increases. As the process continues, some sodium hydroxide solution is withdrawn from center cell as output product and is replaced with water. Sodium chloride is added to the outside cells to replace what has been electrolyzed.

== See also ==
- Electrochemical engineering
- Castner Medal
- Chloralkali process
