= Alexander Fleck, 1st Baron Fleck =

British industrial chemist (1889–1968)

The Right Honourable The Lord Fleck KBE FRS FRSE
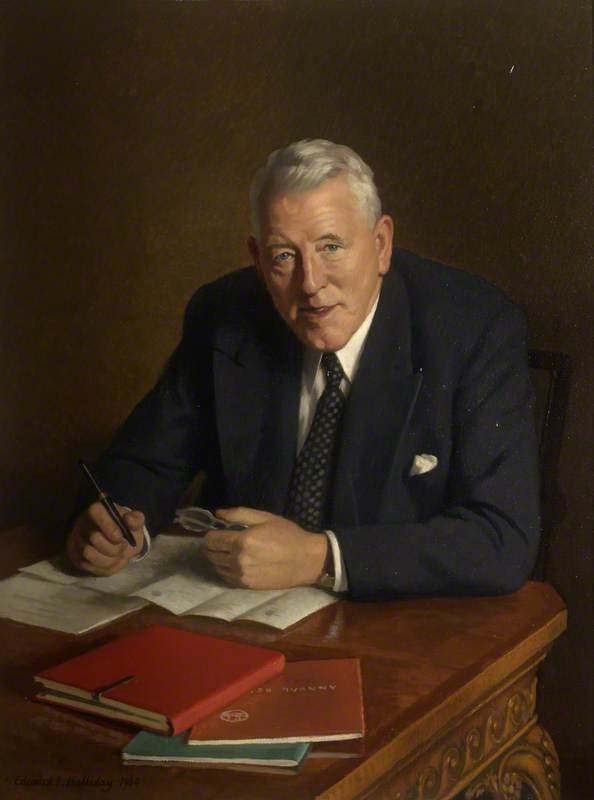
- Alexander Fleck painted in 1960 by E. I. Halliday
- Born: 11 November 1889; Glasgow
- Died: 6 August 1968 (aged 78)
- Education: University of Glasgow
- Awards: KBE; Fellow of the Royal Society (1955); Wilhelm Exner Medal (1957); Castner Medal (1947)
- Scientific career
- Workplaces: Imperial Chemical Industries; Royal Institution; University of Glasgow

Alexander Fleck, 1st Baron Fleck KBE FRS FRSE (11 November 1889 – 6 August 1968) was a British industrial chemist.

== Background and education ==
Fleck was born on 11 November 1889, the son of Robert Fleck, coal-merchant of the firm Alexander Fleck & Co of 45 Hope Street, and his wife, Agnes Hendry Duncan. He was educated in both Saltcoats and Hillhead High School in Glasgow. He left school at the age of fourteen to become a laboratory boy at the University of Glasgow. When Frederick Soddy arrived as a lecturer, Fleck became his assistant.

He studied at evening classes, eventually becoming a student of Glasgow University and graduating BSc in 1911. He then became a post graduate researcher, gaining a doctorate (DSc) in 1916 in the chemistry of radioactive substances. He was associated with the Beatson Oncology Centre where he studied the effects of radium on cancerous growths at the beginning of World War I.

== Career ==
Fleck was appointed to the board of ICI in 1944 and was its chairman from 1953 to 1960. He was also chairman of Scottish Agricultural Industries, the Coal Board Organization Committee, the Scientific Advisory Council, and the Nuclear Safety Advisory Committee. He was elected an Honorary Fellow of the Royal Society in 1955. He also received honorary doctorates from Glasgow University, Durham University, the University of Nottingham, Oxford University, University of London and Dublin University.

In 1960 he was invited to deliver the MacMillan Memorial Lecture to the Institution of Engineers and Shipbuilders in Scotland. He chose the subject "Interdependence of Engineering and Chemistry". He was President of the Royal Institution from 1963 to 1968. In 1961 he was elevated to the peerage as Baron Fleck, of Saltcoats in the County of Ayrshire.

== Personal life ==
In 1917 he married Isabel Mitchell Kelly (died 1955). They had no children.

Lord Fleck died in London on 6 August 1968, aged 78, when the barony became extinct.

Peerage of the United Kingdom
New creation	Baron Fleck; 1961–1968	Extinct
