= Hamilton Castner =

American chemist (1858–1899)

Hamilton Young Castner
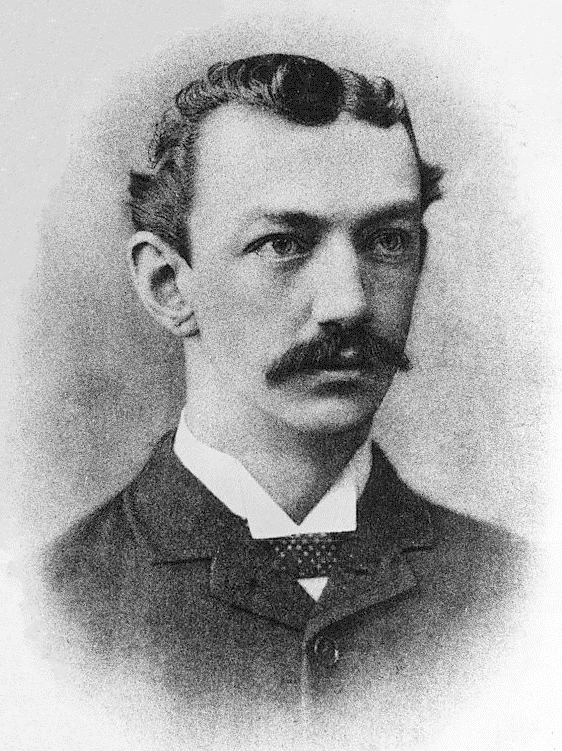
- Born: September 11, 1858; Brooklyn, New York
- Died: October 11, 1899 (aged 41); Saranac Lake, New York
- Citizenship: United States
- Education: Brooklyn Polytechnic Institute (Now New York University College of engineering); Columbia School of Mines (Later the Columbia University College of Engineering)
- Known for: invention of methods to produce sodium metal and sodium hydroxide from soda ash and salt respectively
- Awards: John Scott Medal (1889); Elliott Cresson Medal (1897)
- Scientific career
- Fields: Chemist

Hamilton Young Castner (September 11, 1858 – October 11, 1899) was an American industrial chemist.

== Biography ==
He was born in Brooklyn, New York and educated at the Brooklyn Polytechnic Institute, then at the Columbia University School of Mines. He left without a degree and in 1879 joined his brother, E. B. Castner, as a consulting chemist. He left this business around 1884 and worked to devise a process for manufacturing aluminium by reducing aluminium chloride with sodium. Sodium was relatively expensive at that time and Castner devised a process of producing it by the reduction of caustic soda with carbon, a much cheaper process. He failed to interest American industrialists and travelled to England in 1886.

In 1887 his process helped to lead to the formation of the Aluminium Company in England which produced aluminium of high purity. However, in 1889 it was rendered obsolete by a much cheaper electrochemical process. Castner's only asset then was his cheap sodium and he worked to develop uses for this, including the manufacture of sodium peroxide, a bleaching agent, and sodium cyanide which was used in the gold mining industry.

In 1890 Castner devised a new method for producing very pure caustic soda by the electrolysis of brine in a rocking cell containing mercury. This process also produced the useful by-products, chlorine and hydrogen. When Castner came to patent his process he found that a similar patent had been lodged by Karl Kellner in Germany and that this had been made over to the Solvay Company in Belgium. In order to avoid litigation, Castner's Aluminium Company combined with the Solvay Company to form the Castner-Kellner Alkali Company and they built a large works in Runcorn, Cheshire. The Castner-Kellner process is still in operation in Runcorn today.

Castner suffered from tuberculosis and died in 1899 in Saranac Lake, Franklin county, New York state. He left his estate to his wife, Cora Marion Richter, and his sister, Mary Albaugh. He did not have any children.

== See also ==
- Castner Medal
