= Hermetic Brotherhood of Light =

Occult fraternity

The Hermetic Brotherhood of Light was a Fraternity that descended from the Fratres Lucis in the late 18th century (in turn, derived from the German Order of the Golden and Rosy Cross), and was the seed from which Ordo Templi Orientis (O.T.O.) ('Order of the Temple of the East' or 'Order of Oriental Templars') was created.

Carl Kellner and Paschal Beverly Randolph were members of the Hermetic Brotherhood of Light. In the 1913 M∴M∴M∴ Constitution, it states in Article I, Section I:

Under the style and title: ANCIENT ORDER OF ORIENTAL TEMPLARS, an organization, formerly known as: "The Hermetic Brotherhood of Light", has been reorganized and reconstituted. This reconstituted association is an international organization, and is hereinafter referred to as the O.T.O.
