= Castner Medal =

The Castner Gold Medal on Industrial Electrochemistry is an biennial award given by the Electrochemical Technology Group of Society of Chemical Industry (SCI) to an authority on applied electrochemistry or electrochemical engineering connected to industrial research. The award is named in honor of Hamilton Castner, a pioneer in the field of industrial electrochemistry, who patented in 1892 the mercury cell for the chloralkali process. Castner was an early member of SCI.

The medal is presented in a public lecture, usually at the annual Electrochem conference, which is organised by the Royal Society of Chemistry (RSC) Electrochemistry Interest Group and the SCI Electrochemical Technology Group. When this is not possible, the medal presentation and lecture takes place at SCI's headquarters.

The medal's design was conceived by Humphrey Paget by commission of SCI. At least until 1958, the award was called Castner Gold Medal.

== Castner Medal Winners ==
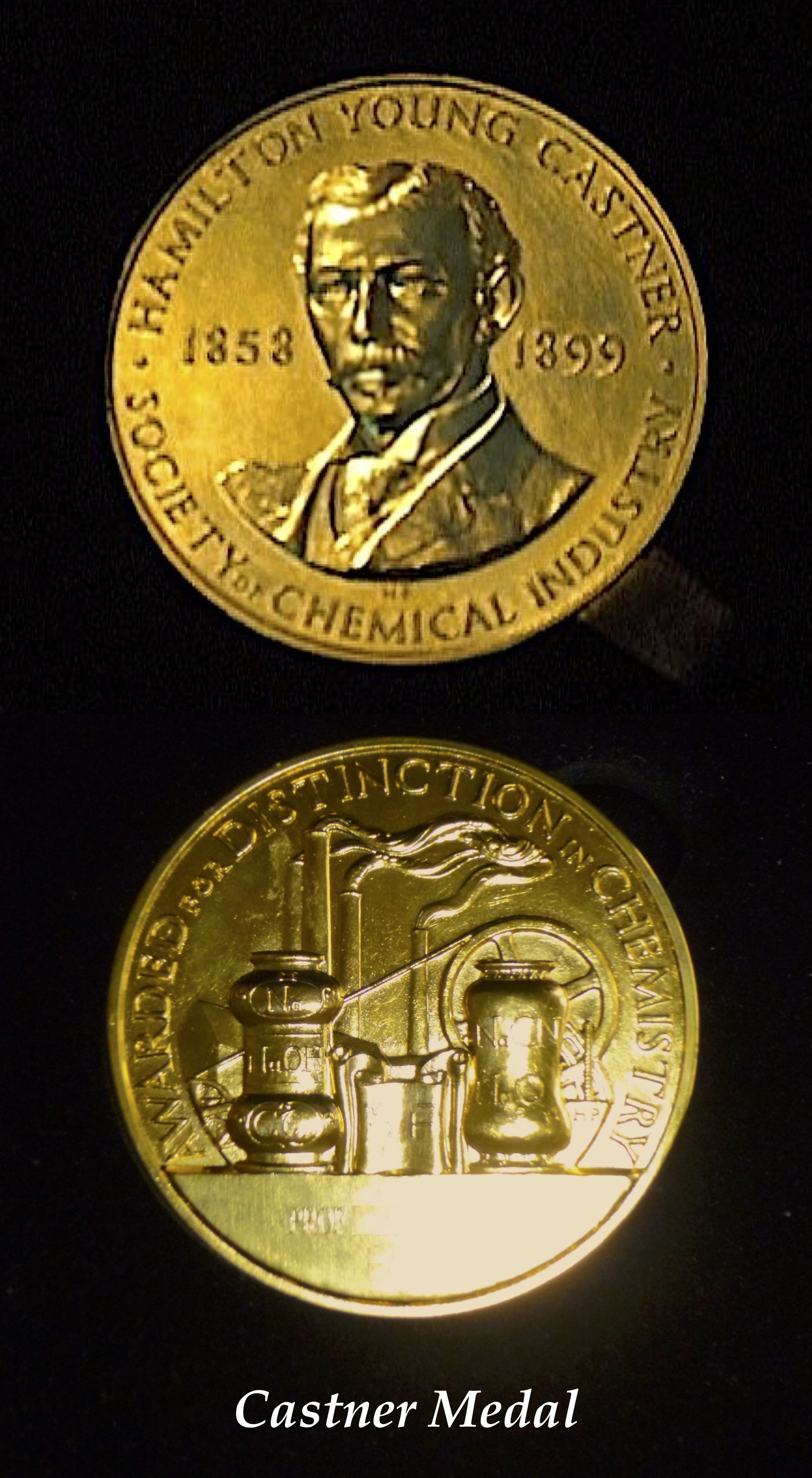
Castner Gold Medal awarded by the Society of Chemical Industry to authorities in the field of Industrial Electrochemistry.

To the date, 23 academics and industrialists have received the award.

- 1947 – Alexander Fleck – British industrial chemist and chair of Imperial Chemical Industries
- 1950 – Christian H. Aall – Noted for his work at Monsanto Chemical Co. and American Metals Climax.
- 1953 – Robert C. Swain – Research chemist, president of Perkin-Elmer, Hoover Institution and American Cyanamid.
- 1956 – Christopher Hinton – Chief engineer at Imperial Chemical Industries and head nuclear engineer of the Atomic Energy Authority.
- 1958 - Ronald Holroyd - Deputy chairman at Imperial Chemical Industries.
- 1960 - William J. Kroll - Inventor of the Kroll process for titanium extraction.
- 1965 - Herbert M. Stanley - Developer of chemical processes at the Central Research Department of the Distillers Company Ltd.
- 1967 - Duncan S. Davies - Scientist and engineer, noted for fibre-reactive dyes, polymers and coatings at Imperial Chemical Industries.
- 1970 - Bernhard Timm - Contributions to ammonia synthesis and heterogeneous catalysis, director of BASF.
- 1974 - S. Puschaver - Contributions to the development of dimensionally stable anodes.
- 1985 - Walther G. Grot - Co-discoverer of Nafion at DuPont Corporation.
- 1990 - Patrick Meares - Expert in structure and transport properties of polymer membranes at University of Exeter.
- 1991 – Hiroto Miyake – Developer and designer of Flemion membranes at Asahi Glass Co.
- 1994 - Gerhard Kreysa - Expert in electrochemical engineering and director of DECHEMA.
- 1997 - Maomi Seko - Developer of ion exchange membranes for chlor-alkali process and president of Asahi Chemical Industry.
- 2002 - Dieter Landolt - Professor of electrochemical engineering at EPFL.
- 2004 – Geoffrey Ballard – Founder of Ballard Power Systems, developer of proton-exchange membrane fuel cell.
- 2007 – Geoffrey H. Kelsall – Professor of electrochemical engineering with interests on modelling and optimisation of electrochemical processes and kinetics at gas evolving electrodes Imperial College London.
- 2009 – Anthony A. Wragg – Professor of electrochemical engineering at University of Exeter. Contributed to the study of mass transport in electrochemical reactors. Longtime editor of the Journal of Applied Electrochemistry.
- 2011 – Maria Skyllas-Kazacos – Developer of the vanadium redox battery. Professor at University of New South Wales.
- 2013 – Derek Pletcher – Professor of electrochemistry with interests in research and consultancy in electrochemical technology University of Southampton.
- 2015 – David E. Williams – Professor of electrochemistry and chemical sensors at University of Auckland.
- 2017 – Frank C. Walsh – Professor of electrochemical engineering with consultancy and research interests in corrosion and protection of metals, electrodeposition, nanostructured electrocatalysts, synthesis, flow batteries, fuel cells and super capacitors at University of Southampton.
- 2019 – Keith Scott – Professor of electrochemical engineering with activities on fuel cells, batteries, microbial and biological fuel cells and electrochemical synthesis at Newcastle University.
- 2022 – Dr. David Hodgson – TFP Hydrogen Products Ltd's Managing Director with 30 year career in applied electrochemistry including work in water electrolysers, the chlor-alkali industry, flow batteries, molten salt electrochemistry, fuel cells and water treatment.

== See also ==
- List of engineering awards
- Electrochemical engineering
- Electrochemistry
