= Edward Partington, 1st Baron Doverdale =

English industrialist (1836–1925)

Edward Partington
- 1st Baron Doverdale
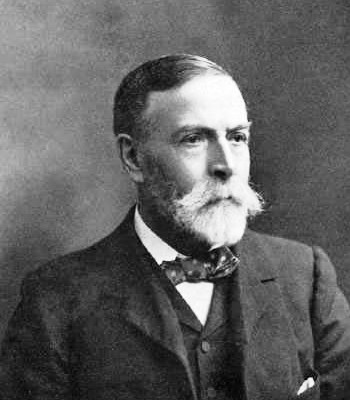
- Predecessor: New creation
- Other titles: Deputy Lieutenant of Derbyshire
- Born: September 28, 1836; Bury, Lancashire, England
- Died: January 5, 1925 (aged 88)
- Noble family: Partington
- Father: David Livsey
- Mother: Sarah Partington
- Occupation: Industrialist

Edward Partington, 1st Baron Doverdale DL (28 September 1836 – 5 January 1925) was an English industrialist.

Partington was born in Bury, the son of Sarah Partington and David Livsey, a blacksmith, and arrived in Glossop in 1874. He, with his partner William Olive, bought the Turn Lee Mill from Thomas Hamer Ibbotson. He bought it to try out a modern method of paper manufacture using the sulfite process. He expanded rapidly with mills in Salford and Barrow in Furness. He merged with Kellner of Vienna and was created Lord Doverdale in 1914. His factories in Charlestown created nearly a 1000 jobs. He employed a thousand workers in his Charlestown Mill, 1 in 12 of the working population. He was a Unitarian and a Liberal. He was a Deputy Lieutenant of Derbyshire. He was made a Baron in the 1916 Prime Minister's Resignation Honours, being created Baron Doverdale, of Westwood Park in the County of Worcester on 6 January 1917.

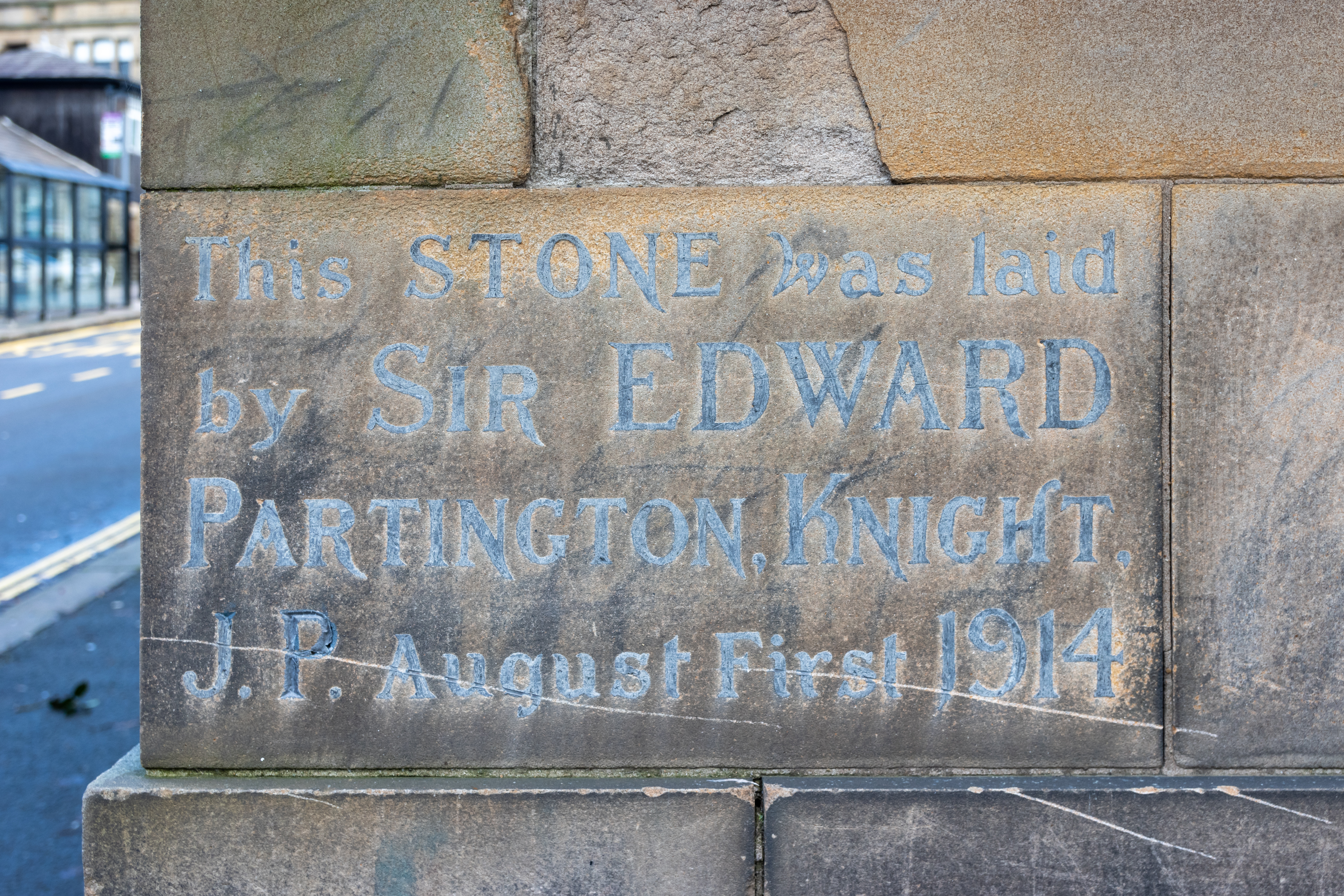
Foundation stone of Partington Theatre in Glossop, laid by Edward

He died suddenly a few hours after visiting his mills one afternoon in 1925.

Peerage of the United Kingdom
New creation	Baron Doverdale; 1917–1925	Succeeded by Oswald Partington
