= 1916 Prime Minister's Resignation Honours =

British government recognitions

The 1916 Prime Minister's Resignation Honours were awards announced on 22 December 1916 to mark the exit of Prime Minister H. H. Asquith, who resigned in early December.

The recipients of honours are displayed here as they were styled before their new honour, and arranged by honour, with classes (Knight, Knight Grand Cross, etc.) and then divisions (Military, Civil, etc.) as appropriate.

== Viscounts ==
- Lord Sandhurst GCSI GCIE
- Lord Cowdray
- Right Hon. Lewis Harcourt MP

== Barons ==
- The Right Hon. Joseph A. Pease MP
- Sir John A. Dewar Bt MP
- Sir Thomas Roe MP
- Sir Edward Partington

== Privy Councillor ==
- John W. Gulland MP
- Thomas Wiles MP
- Leif Jones MP

== Baronet ==
- Right Hon. James H. Campbell KC MP for Dublin University
- John S. Ainsworth MP Member for Argyllshire
- James Hill MP Member for Central Bradford
- Sir Jesse Boot, Chairman of Boots Cash Chemists, knighted in 1909

== Knight ==
- Arthur Carkeek, an Alderman of the Cornwall County Council and a large employer of labour.
- Hugh Fraser, LL.D. Reader and Examiner in Common Law to the Inns of Court
- William Gundry, member of the firm of Ashby, Morris, City Merchants
- The Very Rev. John Herkless, D.D., Principal of St. Andrews University
- Edward Smith, Chairman of the Standing Joint Committee of the Justees for London, Member of the L.C.C. and the County of London Appeal Tribunal
- Evan Spicer, Alderman of the first London County Council and chairman of the council in 1906–7

== Order of the Bath ==
=== Knight Grand Cross of the Order of the Bath (GCB) ===
Civil Division

- The Right Hon. Sir Samuel Evans, President of the Probate, Divorce, and Admiralty Division.

=== Knight Commander of the Order of the Bath (KCB) ===
Civil Division

- Maurice Bonham-Carter, Private Secretary to Mr. Asquith

=== Commander of the Order of the Bath (CB) ===
- The Hon. Theophilus Russell CVO Diplomatic Secretary to the Secretary of State for Foreign Affairs

== Order of St Michael and St George ==
=== Knight Commander of the Order of St Michael and St George (KCMG) ===
- Hon. Eric Drummond CB Private secretary to Mr. Balfour, former private secretary to Mr. Asquith from 1912
