= Fiat Lux (UFO religion) =

Neo-revelationist UFO religion

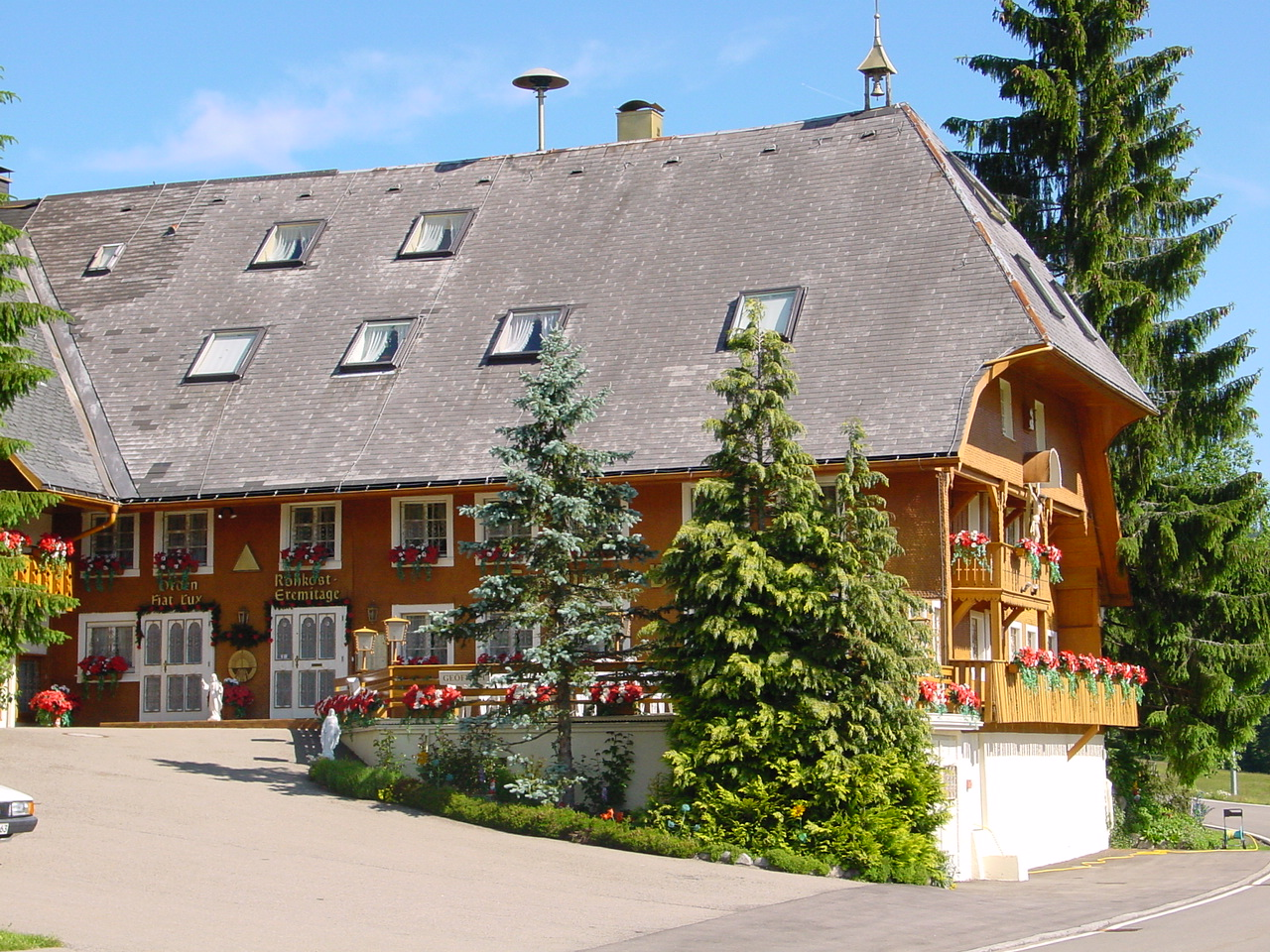
- Type: UFO religion
- Founder: Erika Bertschinger-Eicke
- Origin: 1980

Fiat Lux (Latin for "let there be light") is a neo-revelationist UFO religion whose members are primarily located in the Black Forest of Germany. It was led by Erika Bertschinger-Eicke, who went by Uriella.

== Background ==
Erika Hedwig Gessler was born in Zurich on February 20, 1929. She grew up in conservative Catholic family. As an adult, she travelled to England and the US. After a first marriage, she married Max Bertschinger, who died on January 12, 1980.

== History ==
The 'religious order' of Fiat Lux was founded in 1980 by Swiss-born Erika Bertschinger-Eicke who adopted the name Uriella as its spiritual leader and trance medium. According to members, Bertschinger receives divine messages from Jesus Christ as well as Mary, mother of Jesus.

The group also believes the apocalypse is coming, and that alien ships will arrive to evacuate adherents, followed by the transformation of the earth into a new paradise, called "Amora". According to Bertschinger, the end of the world was due to arrive in 1998, but has since been postponed "due to the immense praying energies of the faithful".

Characterized as a cult, Fiat Lux has been estimated to contain an "inner circle" of approximately 135 members in addition to 800 "dedicated followers" and 2000 "sympathizers". Devotees reportedly follow a monastic lifestyle, including scheduled prayer times, the wearing of white ceremonial robes, and adherence to a strict vegetarian diet.

The order's founder, Uriella (born 20 February 1929 in Zurich, Switzerland), died on 24 February 2019.

According to German newspapers, Bertschinger called for the release of accused pedophile Beat Meier.
