= Baron Doverdale =

Extinct barony in the Peerage of the United Kingdom

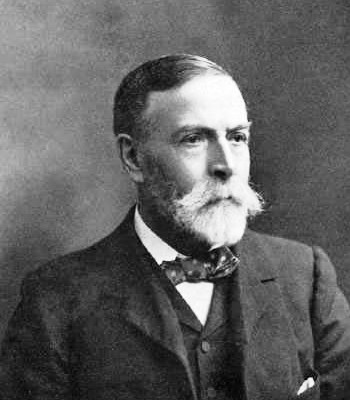
Edward Partington, 1st Baron Doverdale.

Baron Doverdale, of Westwood Park in the County of Worcester, was a title in the Peerage of the United Kingdom. It was created on 6 January 1917 for the industrialist and politician Sir Edward Partington. He was succeeded by his second but eldest surviving son, the second Baron. He represented High Peak and Shipley in Parliament. The title became extinct on the death of his childless son, the third Baron, on 18 January 1949.

Herbert Partington (1868-1916), eldest son of the first Baron, was Mayor of Glossop. He predeceased his father, leaving only daughters.

== Barons Doverdale (1917) ==
- Edward Partington, 1st Baron Doverdale (1836–1925)
- Oswald Partington, 2nd Baron Doverdale (1872–1935)
- Edward Alexander Partington, 3rd Baron Doverdale (1904–1949)
