= Geoffrey Ballard =

Canadian geophysicist and businessman

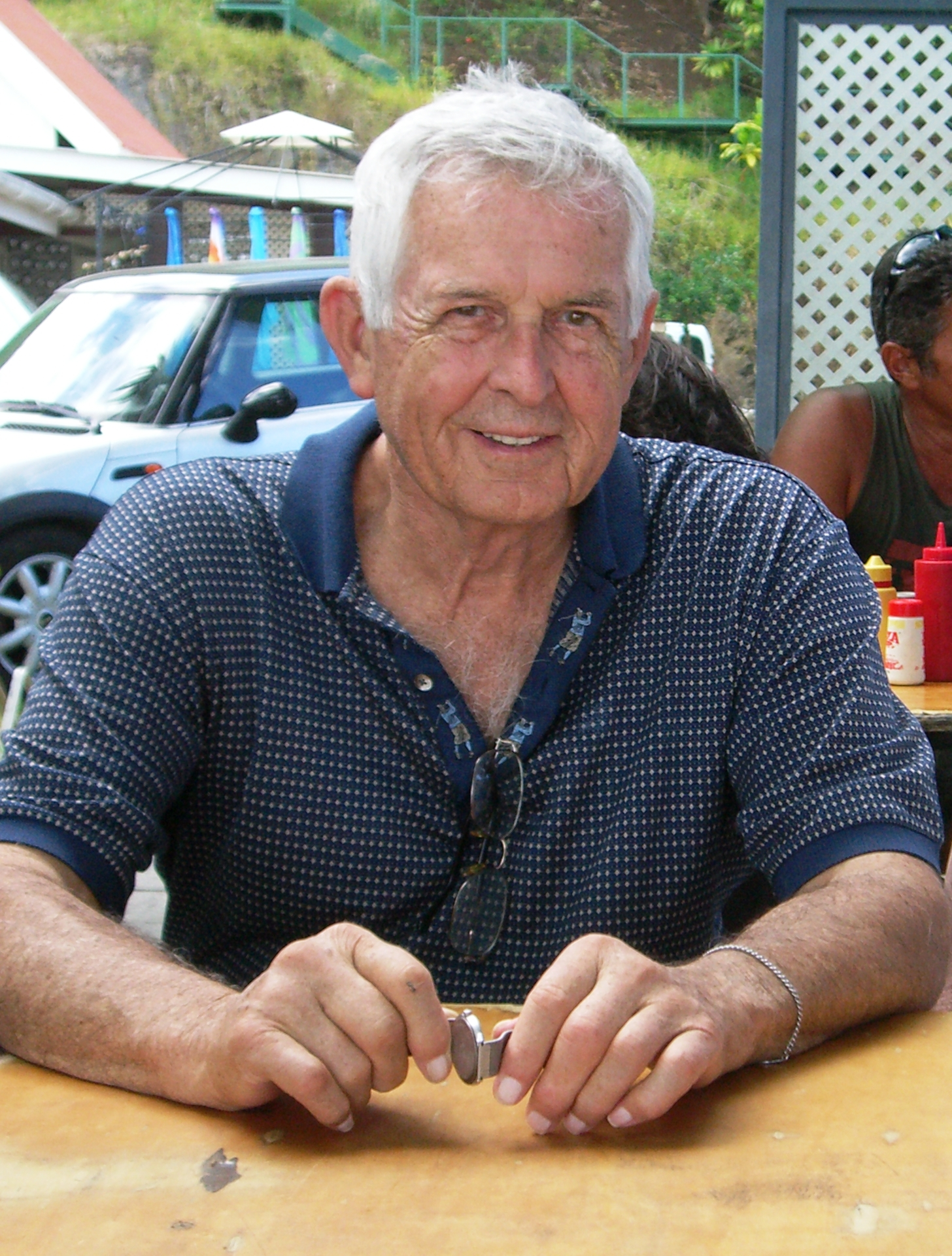
- Born: Geoffrey Edwin Hall Ballard; 16 October 1932; Niagara Falls, Ontario
- Died: 2 August 2008 (aged 75); North Vancouver, British Columbia
- Education: Queens University; Washington University in St. Louis
- Spouse: Shelagh Ballard (1932) (m. 1956–2008)
- Children: Curtis (1957); Mark (1959); Edward (1963)
- Parent(s): Archibald Hall Ballard; Jessie Marguerite Mildred
- Awards: Castner Medal (2004)

Geoffrey Edwin Hall Ballard, CM, OBC (16 October 1932 – 2 August 2008) was a Canadian geophysicist and businessman. A longtime advocate of replacing the internal combustion engine, in 1979 Ballard founded what would become Ballard Power Systems to develop commercial applications of the proton exchange membrane fuel cell (PEM). Acknowledged worldwide as the father of the fuel cell industry, Time named him a "Hero for the Planet" in 1999.

== Early life and education ==
Ballard was born in Niagara Falls, Ontario, to Jessie Marguerite Mildred of the Rowntree's family in York and Archibald Hall Ballard of Staten Island, New York. His father studied electrochemical engineering at the University of Toronto and later specialized in the area of radiation. He was working at Carborundum Corporation when the lab director fell overboard from a boat during a party and was washed over Niagara Falls, so Archibald Ballard was promoted to lab director at a relatively young age in his mid-40s. He spent most of World War II at Oak Ridge, Tennessee, working on the atomic bomb.

After high school in Niagara Falls, Ballard attended Queen's University in Kingston, Ontario, studying geological engineering. Here he met his future wife, Shelagh, and they married and graduated the same year, in 1956. Ballard secured a position at Shell Oil in Alberta, leading exploration teams on horseback. He left Shell for Mobil Oil and travelled around the world on exploration trips. During these trips his advice was often ignored as he was "only" a BSc (difficult enough in 1950s), and after several such incidents he decided to leave industry and pursue a doctorate in earth and planetary sciences from Washington University in St. Louis.

After earning his PhD in 1963, Ballard worked as a civilian for the U.S. Army, specializing in microwave communications and studying how to hide refueling tanks under the ice in Greenland. Ballard was working for the Army at Fort Huachuca in Arizona in 1973 when the oil crisis hit. The U.S. government responded by establishing the U.S. Federal Energy Conservation Research office, and started looking for someone to run it. Given his background running projects, the Army seconded him to become the office's director, initially for six months.

He quickly grew disillusioned with the political system. "Energy systems are notorious for their long gestation periods, often twenty years or longer, [but] there had to be a pay-off in a product within five to seven years in order to justify the public money being put in. There are political cycles involving re-election, so the politicians didn't want to put money into systems that were going to come to fruition in some other generation. You sent out the plans, and they hacked and cut at them." When the contract ran out, he decided to quit and strike out on his own.

== American Energizer ==
One of the studies he had been involved in at the Conservation Research office was on electric cars powered by conventional lead-acid batteries. None of these struck him as practical, but he was convinced that electric traction was the future. He told Discover magazine in a 2002 interview that "My goal from the very beginning was replacing the internal combustion engine -- just getting that off the streets." Ballard had earlier met Ralph Schwartz in Arizona, who introduced him to the idea of using lithium batteries in place of lead-acid, as they would be much lighter. However, at the time, lithium batteries were not able to be recharged. Schwartz convinced Ballard that they should study the problem, and Ballard cashed in his pension to buy a portion of their new joint venture, American Energizer.

Schwartz and Ballard were introduced to Keith Prater at the University of Texas chemistry department, and sold him on the idea of developing a new rechargeable lithium battery technology with them. Prater was able to quickly determine that no one knew what the product of the lithium-salt reactions in existing batteries were, and guessed that it was lithium dithionite, which he was able to synthesize. Working in a trailer, Ballard and Schwartz built a simple battery and Prater brought a sample of the lithium dithionite, and when they were placed together and charged, a weak current was produced. After further development the system was able to be recharged about a dozen times.

With the technology looking like it could be made into a commercial enterprise, Ballard contacted an acquaintance, John Horton, to provide further backing. Horton was in the process of re-fitting the Ben Franklin (PX-15) in North Vancouver for oil exploration, and Ballard convinced him that their new battery would be a perfect fit. Horton agreed to provide several thousand dollars a month in funding. With this in place, Ballard purchased an abandoned motel in Arizona for $2,000 and set about turning it into a lab.

By 1977 the batteries were coming along, and Ballard and Prater were shuttling back and forth between Arizona and Vancouver. Ballard had always wanted to return to Canada, so Schwartz sold his interest in the battery technology to Ballard for $1, while Ballard sold his interest in Schwartz's latest venture, a mechanical anti-lock braking system for the same $1. In 1979 Ballard moved to Vancouver and became president and CEO of Ultra Energy.

In Canada, Ultra Energy operated out of the same hangar where Horton was re-fitting his submarine. By the mid-1970s the refit was complete, with no battery in site, and Horton dropped his support for the battery project. After obtaining some private bridge financing, they won a contract for a non-rechargeable lithium battery with a shelf life of 10 years for the fire detector company, Firenetics. After about a year the battery was ready and production was going to be started in Hong Kong, when, to Ultra's surprise, Firenetics filed for bankruptcy after a long lawsuit with General Electric. Ultra Energy was insolvent.

== Ballard Power Systems ==
The main Ultra Energy team immediately re-formed as Ballard Research, taking over offices directly across the street from the Ultra ones. Ballard started calling old contacts in the oil industry, looking for companies that might be interested in diversifying their energy holdings. Shell was interested and kept the company afloat for a time, but dropped their interest when one of the minority shareholders held out. In mid-1981, Amoco decided to take over the rechargeable side of the company, and paid off most of the company's local debts. Now solvent, the company quickly started looking for applications for their technology, and won contracts with the Canadian Forces to further develop their single-use long-life battery. This led to a successful production line producing thousands of cells for the U.S. and Canadian militaries.

While the single-use design was successful, the rechargeable version never matured. In 1983, Ballard, Prater and Paul Howard started looking for new ideas for their development side to work on as the funds for the battery project dried up. Among a variety of ideas were a number of attempts to find government funding, which eventually led them to a Department of National Defense (DND) request for proposals for bids to produce a low-cost solid polymer fuel cell. Now known as PEM's, these cells had only been used commercially in Project Gemini and a few other space probes, and General Electric gave up on the technology when NASA moved onto other fuel cell designs for Project Apollo and the Space Shuttle. Although a number of attempts had been made to lower the high cost of PEM cells since then, none had been commercially successful.

At the time, no one in the company had any direct experience with fuel cells, and Ballard himself reputedly asked "What's a fuel cell?" when the topic was first brought up. Prater, with an extensive electrochemical background, flew to the Los Alamos National Laboratory in New Mexico, where limited PEM research was still being carried out. He managed to gather a small number of parts from test cells that would provide an early start. Meanwhile, Ballard sent teams to Ottawa to better understand the contract. Armed with this information from both sources, they won the $500,000 contract, which called for them to provide three prototype cells that produced between 50 and 150 watts and be ready in 28 months. After meeting the requirements, they won a follow-up contract, and it was during this project, in 1986, when they reached a milestone of producing four times as much energy per unit volume as any previous fuel cell.

In 1987 Ballard won a contract with Perry Oceanographics to provide fuel cells for their small submersibles. After some difficulties in developing a stack of the required 2 kW size using their then-current" Mark IV" cell design, the system was successfully installed and became one of the first commercial fuel cell system since the 1960s. An upgrade to the "Mark V" cell design dramatically improved performance, providing 4.1 kW from a stack the same size as the original 2 kW model. A contract with the Royal Navy soon followed, and although the resulting cells were not used as the Royal Navy decided to go all-nuclear, a research contract allowed the company to continue improving the cells.

Development from these engineering samples to real-world products was going to be long and expensive. Although the battery line continued to do well, the profits it generated were not enough to run the company as a whole. Ballard started looking for new capital, and found Mike Brown, a founder of the Vancouver-based Ventures West venture capital company. Ventures West provided several rounds of funding, and Brown suggested that if the company wanted to be successful it was going to need new leadership who was familiar with dealing with large companies. Although the founders found it difficult to accept a stranger into their midst, they were eventually won over and Firoz Rasul became the new CEO. Rasul immediately instituted a development plan with a timeline of goals that had to be met and go/no-go milestones.

The company was re-organized, spinning off the battery side to BTC Engineering, while the fuel cell side became Ballard Technologies Corp. Feeling the technology was ready for commercial use, in 1989 Ballard raised $4 million in public money from the British Columbia government to build a fuel cell powered bus, introducing it at Science World in 1993. He took the bus to energy fairs around the world, and Daimler-Chrysler and Ford invested $750 million to buy a one-third stake in the newly public Ballard Power Systems. Ballard told Time in 1999 that the fuel-cell cars should become economical by 2010 and "the internal combustion engine will go the way of the horse. It will be a curiosity to my grandchildren."

Taking the technology from laboratory to the road proved very difficult, and after years of development and many rounds of additional funding, Ballard left active management in 1998. The automotive power division was sold to Daimler-Chrysler and Ford in 2008 for $96.6 million, and Daimler currently operates a small number of fuel cell busses in Hamburg, United States, Japan and Singapore. Ballard Power Systems continues its work on PEMFC's for stationary power use and backup systems.

== After Ballard ==
After leaving full-time management at Ballard Power Systems, in 2000 Ballard formed General Hydrogen, which worked on the problems of generating and distributing hydrogen. In 2007, the company was sold to Plug Power for $10 million.

In 1999 he was named by Time as "Hero of the Planet". In 2002 he was named "Business Leader of the Year" by Scientific American. He received the World Technology Network Award in Energy in 1999, and in Environment in 2000. He also received the Gutenberg International Environment prize in Sweden in 2000. He served as chair of the Canadian Hydrogen Association and as an advisory board member for the Institute of Transportation Studies, University of California.

He died of complications from liver disease at Lions Gate Hospital in North Vancouver.

== Quotation ==
It will take a combined effort of academia, government, and industry to bring about the change from a gasoline economy to a hydrogen economy. The forces are building and progress is being made. It is of major importance that a change of this magnitude not be forced on unwilling participants, but that all of us work together for an economically viable path to change.

— Geoffrey Ballard, World Hydrogen Energy Conference
