= Leopold Engel =

German occult writer (1858–1931)

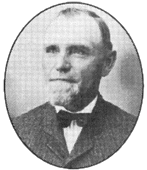
- Born: 19 April 1858; St Petersburg, Russia
- Died: 8 November 1931 (aged 73)

Leopold Engel (1858 – 1931) was a German writer and occultist.

== Early life ==
Engel was born in St Petersburg, Russia. His father was Karl Dietrich Engel (1824–1913), a violinist who in 1846 became Konzertmeister (leader) of the orchestra of the Imperial Russian Theatre.

== Career ==
Leopold Engel went to Germany, finally settling in Dresden where he wrote extensively on the Faust legend. He became a follower of mysticus Jakob Lorber (1800–1864) who wrote ten volumes of "inspired" teachings. In 1891 Engel himself heard an "inner voice" which commanded him to write an 11th volume of Lorber's work, The Great Gospel of John.

During the 1890s he became involved with Theodor Reuss in reviving the Illuminati in Germany, setting up an irregular masonic lodge which they called the Ludwig Lodge. This and several other lodges they were active in were not recognised by any of the regular German Grand Lodges. This association came to an end on 3 July 1903 with Engel's expulsion along with his friend Siegmund Miller.
