= Jakob Lorber =

Austrian musician

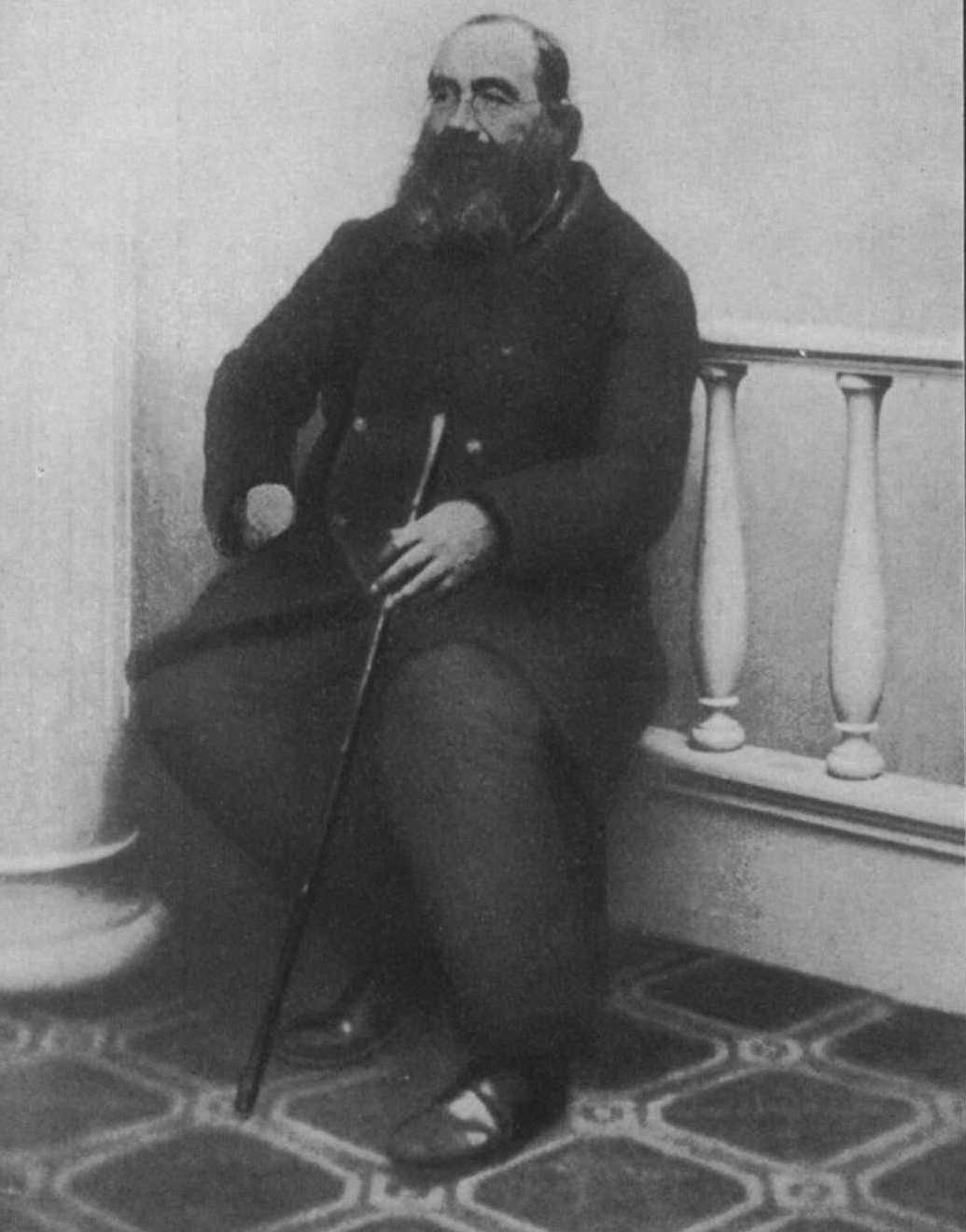
Jakob Lorber.

Jakob Lorber (22 July 1800 – 23 August 1864) was a Christian mystic and self-professed visionary from the Duchy of Styria who promoted liberal Universalism, and who referred to himself as "God's scribe". He wrote that, on 15 March 1840, he began hearing an "inner voice" from the "region" of his heart, thereafter transcribing what it said. By the time of his death, 24 years later, he had written over 10,000 pages of detailed manuscripts.

Primarily, his writings were published posthumously, amounting to a "New Revelation" and the contemporary "Lorber movement". This formed one of the major European neo-revelationist movements, mostly active in German-speaking Europe, although parts of Lorber's writings have been translated into over 20 languages (according to the website of the Lorber Publisher). Followers and adherents have not formed a sect or cult, but rather continue in their own denominations.

== Biography ==
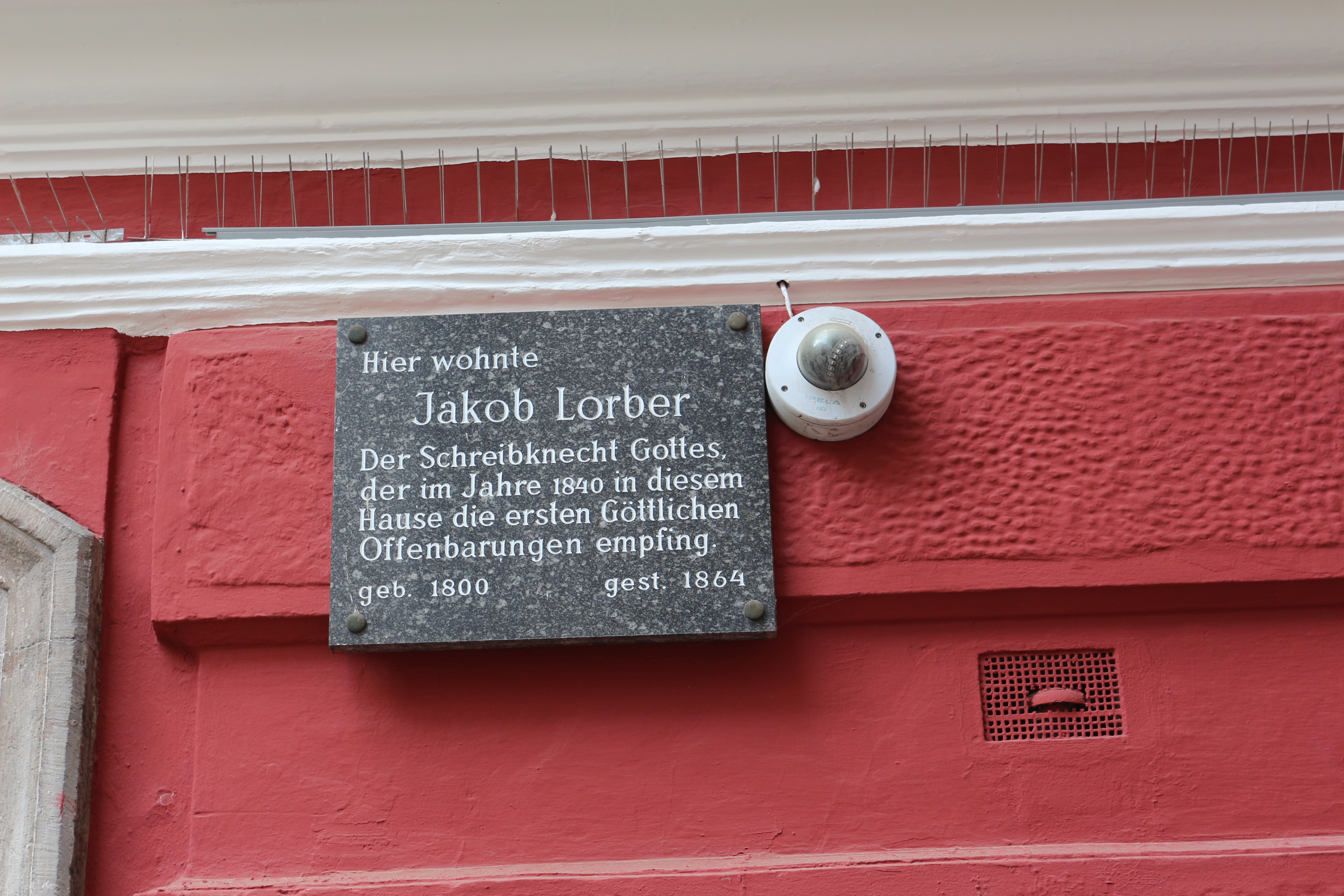
Here lived Jakob Lorber, God's scribe, who received the first Divine Revelations in this house in the year 1840. Born 1800, died 1864.

Jakob Lorber was born in Kanischa, a small village in the Jahring parish, Duchy of Styria (now Kaniža pri Jarenini in Lower Styria, Slovenia), to peasants Michael Lorber and his wife, Maria (née Tautscher). He trained as a village schoolteacher. A brief biography, by his friend Karl Gottfried Ritter von Leitner, indicates that Lorber was an "uncomplicated" person.

Lorber was observed, while writing, by several well-to-do men in the Styrian capital city of Graz, including Carl-Friedrich Zimpel, the mayor of Graz (Anton Hüttenbrenner) and his composer brother (Anselm Hüttenbrenner), poet and Secretary to the Estates Karl Gottfried von Leitner, a Anton Kammerhuber and Leopold Cantily (pharmacist of Graz), among others. Likewise, these men verified his simplistic way of life. Lorber was open and friendly regarding his transcriptions, yet found himself involved in petty investigations designed to prove that he was a staging a hoax. For instance, the wife of one of his friends was certain that Lorber had studied the material he was pretending to hear from the inner voice, yet she never found the scientific books she had suggested he was hiding, eventually finding his sole research material to be a copy of the Christian Bible.

Lorber had musical talents, and learned the violin, taking lessons from the famed virtuoso Niccolò Paganini, and once giving a concert at La Scala in Milan. In 1840, the same year that he claimed to begin hearing the inner voice, Lorber was offered the position of assistant musical director at the theatre in Trieste. He claimed that the inner voice, however, directed him to decline the position and follow a quiet life of solitude instead. Lorber's writings reveal that the inner voice spoke freely in first person as the voice of Jesus.

== Prose style ==
Lorber's prose has been described as compelling, moving some readers to compare it with writings by other mystics such as Emanuel Swedenborg, Jakob Boehme and Rudolf Steiner. Lorber himself makes reference to Swedenborg, in his book From Hell to Heaven (book 2 chapter 104 verse 4) and in The Spiritual Sun (vol. 1, chap. 16).

== The Great Gospel of John ==
In the Great Gospel of John, the narrator, Jesus of Nazareth, explains that he is the creator of the material universe, which was designed both as a confinement of Satan, and so he could take upon himself the condition of a man. He says he did this to inspire his children, who could otherwise not perceive him in his primordial form as a spirit. He gives descriptions of the eons of time involved in creating the Earth. He does so in a manner similar to the modern theory of evolution all the way up to the point several thousand years ago when Jesus placed Adam upon the Earth, which at the time contained man-like creatures who did not have free will, being simply the most clever of the animals.

In a comprehensive manner, the Great Gospel of John continually emphasizes the importance of free will. In this book, heaven and hell are presented as conditions already within humankind, expressed according to whether they live in harmony or contrary to God's "divine order". The Great Gospel of John also states that the Gospels of John and Matthew were written at the time of the events they chronicle; for instance, Lorber writes that Jesus specifically told Matthew to take notes during the Sermon on the Mount. Such an account is contrary to the current consensus of New Testament scholarship, which typically places the authorship of Matthew some years after the resurrection of Jesus and that of John even later. However, in the Great Gospel of John, the narrator explains this, claiming that many writers described him, including several authors named Matthew, who all wrote similarly over many years.

== Paul's epistle to the Laodiceans ==
In 1844, Lorber claimed to have heard, by his inner voice, the "lost" letter that Paul the Apostle might have penned to an early Christian assembly of Laodiceans, as referred to in the Epistle to the Colossians 4:16.

Several texts purporting to be the lost letter survive, notably one brief text preserved in medieval Vulgate manuscripts, attested from the 6th century. Another candidate is attributed to Marcion, listed in the Muratorian fragment. Marcion's text is lost, the Vulgate text is widely recognized as pseudepigraphical, and was decreed uncanonical by the 1439–1443 Council of Florence. There is no resemblance between the letters produced by Lorber via his "inner voice" and the surviving manuscripts. The publisher of the Lorber manuscript claims that the lost letters reflect the "falling away" of the Christian Church from so-called "true Christianity".

== Reception ==
=== Publication ===
Lorber posthumously attracted a following, and his writings were published and frequently reprinted, mostly with Lorber & Turm, a dedicated publisher based in Bietigheim-Bissingen, Germany. The original manuscripts and copies of some of the manuscripts by close friends of Lorber are still preserved in the archives of the Lorber & Turm publisher.

The German philosopher E. F. Schumacher refers to the New Revelation (NR) in his book "A Guide for the Perplexed" as follows: "They (the books of the NR) contain many strange things which are unacceptable to modern mentality, but at the same time contain such plethora of high wisdom and insight that it would be difficult to find anything more impressive in the whole of world literature. Lorber's books, at the same time, are full of statements on scientific matters which flatly contradicted the sciences of his time and anticipated a great deal of modern physics and astronomy... There is no rational explanation for the range, profundity and precision of their contents."

Lorber's work is divided into several books which, in aggregate, are called the New Revelation.

His Great Gospel of John was published in ten volumes and frequently reprinted, the 8th edition dating to 1996. The Gospel of Jacob appeared in a 12th edition in 2006. Lorber's works have partially been translated into English, appearing with Merkur Publishing.

=== Adherents ===
Lorber and his friends were members of the Roman Catholic Church. Lorber's revelations asked them not to leave the church, but to convince it (the church) of the genuinely divine nature of the "New Revelation" by leading exemplary lives. Occultist Leopold Engel was one of Lorber's followers, worrying an 11th volume claiming to be a follow-up to Lorber's Great Gospel of John close to 30 years after Lorber's death.

There is a movement of adherents of Lorber's writings (Lorber-Bewegung, Lorberianer, Lorber-Gesellschaften), mostly active in German-speaking Europe. There is no organizational structure beyond small regional circles. While there is no accurate estimate of the total number of adherents, it likely exceeds 100,000 worldwide.

=== Status in the Church of Christ with the Elijah Message ===
In one of the sacred books of all the three factions of the Church of Christ with the Elijah Message, Word of the Lord Brought to Mankind by an Angel, Lorber is named as one of the servants of God from the German-speaking area.

=== Criticism ===
One main point of criticism of Lorber's works was the use of the first person as if the writings were dictated by Jesus himself. Additionally, some of his statements can be considered antisemitic, and Lorber was lauded by the antisemitic proponents of Ariosophy, a form of racial mysticism, during the 1920s (e.g., by Lanz von Liebenfels, who, in 1926 called Jakob Lorber "the greatest ariosophic medium of the modern era" [das grösste ariosophische Medium der Neuzeit]). Proponents of Lorber's belief system argue that that salvation comes to humankind from the Jews, that one should return to Judaism, and that the God of the Jews is the only true, eternal God. It is also said to be the will of God (or Jesus) that all humans should be friends, whether they are Jews or gentiles.

Kurt Hutten, former chairman of the Evangelische Zentralstelle für Weltanschauungsfragen (EZW), an apologetic institution of the Evangelical Church in Germany, has identified Swedenborg and Lorber as recipients of equally valid private revelation. Official statements of the EZW are more skeptical, assuming psychological explanations for Lorber's revelations. EZW points to a 1966 University of Berne dissertation by Antoinette Stettler-Schär that diagnosed Lorber with paranoid schizophrenia. The diagnosis has been dismissed by Bernhard Grom, who diagnosed self-induced hallucination. Andreas Finke, vice-chairman of the EZW, concluded that the content of Lorber's revelations reflect both the period during which they were written down and the knowledge of their author, identifying them as "pious poetry in the best sense of the term, but not divine dictation."

== Bibliography ==
- Das grosse Evangelium Johannis (The Great Gospel of John), first edition 1871, 10 volumes, Lorber-Verlag, 1996 reprint: ISBN 978-3-87495-213-2 ff.
  - "condensed version" in English, Zluhan Verlag (1985), ISBN 978-3-87495-305-4.
- Die Haushaltung Gottes (The Household of God), 3 vols., Lorber-Verlag, 5th ed. (1981), ISBN 978-3-87495-200-2.
  - English translation: Zluhan Verlag (1995) ISBN 978-3-87495-314-6.
- Die geistige Sonne, 2 vols., Lorber-Verlag, 9th ed. (1996), ISBN 978-3-87495-206-4.
- Die natürliche Sonne Bietigheim Württemberg, Neu-Salems-Verlag (1928)
- Die Heilkraft des Sonnenlichtes, Lorber-Verlag, 2006 reprint: ISBN 978-3-87495-175-3.
- Jenseits der Schwelle: Sterbeszenen, Lorber-Verlag, 2004 reprint (9th ed.): ISBN 978-3-87495-163-0.
- Die Jugend Jesu. Das Jakobus-Evangelium, 12th ed. (1996), ISBN 978-3-87495-164-7.
- Die Fliege: Einblicke in die Wunder der Schöpfung , Zluhan Verlag, 7th ed. (2000), ISBN 978-3-87495-168-5.
- Bischof Martin: Die Entwicklung einer Seele im Jenseits , 3rd ed. (2003), ISBN 978-3-87495-009-1.
- Die drei Tage im Tempel , Zluhan Verlag, 10th ed. (1995), ISBN 978-3-87495-014-5.
- Naturgeheimnisse: Das Naturgeschehen und sein geistiger Hintergrund , Lorber-Verlag, 3rd ed. (1994), ISBN 978-3-87495-045-9.
- Die Wiederkunft Christi: Ein Entwicklungsbild der Menschheit , Zluhan Verlag, 5th ed. (2000), ISBN 978-3-87495-109-8.
- Paulus' Brief an die Gemeinde in Laodizea, Zluhan Verlag; 6th ed. (1993), ISBN 978-3-87495-124-1.
- Briefwechsel Jesu mit Abgarus Ukkama von Edessa, ISBN 978-3-87495-011-4.
- Der Saturn: Darstellung dieses Planeten samt Ring und Monden und seiner Lebewesen, Lorber-Verlag, 4th ed. (2009), ISBN 978-3-87495-048-0.
- Erde und Mond, Zluhan Verlag, 2000 reprint of 4th ed. (1953), ISBN 978-3-87495-165-4.
- Der Großglockner: Ein Evangelium der Berge, Zluhan Verlag, 7th ed. (2009), ISBN 978-3-87495-111-1.
- Ritter von Leitner: Jakob Lorber, der Steiermärkische Theosoph
- Junge Michael: Dokumentation um Jakob Lorber. Books on Demand GmbH, 2004, ISBN 3-8334-1562-2
- Hutten Kurt: Seher – Grübler – Enthusiasten. Das Buch der traditionellen Sekten und religiösen Sonderbewegungen. Quell Verlag, Stuttgart 1997, ISBN 3-7918-2130-X
- Pöhlmann Matthias (ed.): "Ich habe euch noch viel zu sagen ...": Gottesboten – Propheten – Neuoffenbarer. EZW-Texte 169. Evangelische Zentralstelle für Weltanschauungsfragen, Berlin 2003, ISSN 0085-0357
- Obst Helmut:Apostel und Propheten der Neuzeit. Vandenhoeck & Ruprecht, Göttingen 2000, ISBN 3-525-55438-9, ISBN 3-525-55439-7, 233–264
- Gassmann Lothar: Kleines Sekten-HandbuchMago-Bucher, 2005, ISBN 3-9810275-0-7, 92–95
- Stettler Antoinette-Schär: Jakob Lorber: Sektenstifters eines Psychopathologie zur. Dissertation an der Medizinischen Fakultät der Universität Bern, 1966
- Johanna Böhm: Eine kritische Durchsicht.
