= Neo-revelationism =

Neo-revelationism is a term for the beliefs of religious groups, especially Christian or Christianity-derived who claim direct revelation beyond claims of divine inspiration associated with the Christian Bible proper, but the term is also applicable relative to the Baháʼí Faith, and Ahmadiyya movement relative to mainstream Islam, and to Messiah claimants in a context of Judaism. The English term is a translation of the German Neuoffenbarung.

== Within the Christian church ==
The Roman Catholic Church in principle accepts the possibility of "private revelations", and recognizes certain instances (in practice mostly Marian apparitions) in the sense of nihil obstat, i.e. the Church proclaims the possibility of a revelation being genuinely of divine origin without placing any positive claim to the effect. The Catholic Church agrees with Protestants in that public revelation ended with the death of the Apostle John. Private revelation is not binding on Catholics and does not inform any new doctrine. Some Protestant Reformers held different views, and taught that the miraculous gifts (including prophecy) ended with the death of the Apostles or soon thereafter. This doctrine, called cessationism, is still held by conservative Evangelicals (especially some Baptists and Calvinists), who believe that the Bible is the final and complete revelation of God. By contrast, the Charismatic Movement emphasizes the claim that prophecy is available to contemporary believers.

Visions of Jesus and Mary have been common throughout the history of Christianity. The technical term of receiving revelations verbally, as opposed to in visions, is interior locution. For example, Mother Teresa stated that she had been experiencing interior locutions, but that she preferred to remain private as to their contents.

There are numerous examples of such instances in Christian mysticism, during the medieval period and in the modern era e.g. Jacob Boehme (1575–1624) and Emanuel Swedenborg (1688–1772), and later Jakob Lorber (1800–1864), Gottfried Mayerhofer (1807–1877), Bertha Dudde (1891–1965) and others. Proponents of neo-revelationism point to John 16:12–14, taking "I have yet many things to say unto you, but ye cannot bear them now" as an announcement of continued revelation outside of the biblical canon. 12th-century mystic Joachim of Fiore also pointed to Revelation 14:6 which presages an "everlasting gospel" yet to be taught in the future. Opponents, on the other hand, tend to point to the warning against false prophets in Matthew 24.

== New religious movements ==
Outside mainstream Christianity, there have also been numerous new religious movements led by people either claiming to be directly inspired by Jesus, or indeed to be Jesus returned.

Other examples of notable neo-revelationist movements are the Unification Church, Universal Life, Church of the Last Testament and Fiat Lux. A number of movements of Spiritual Christianity in tsarist Russia also fall under this category.

== See also ==
- Jerusalem syndrome
- List of people who have claimed to be Jesus
- Montanism
- Prophecy
- Unverified personal gnosis
