= History of fertilizer =

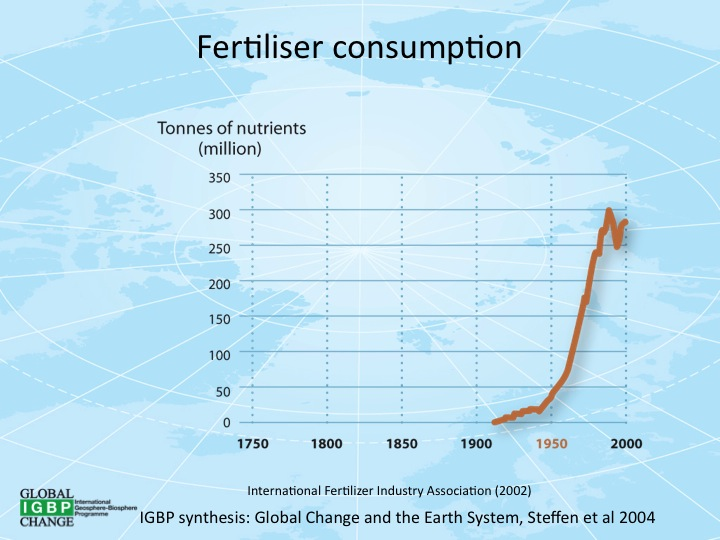
Global Fertiliser consumption over time

The history of fertilizer has largely shaped political, economic, and social circumstances in their traditional uses.

Starting in the 20th century, chemically synthesized, synthetic fertilizers have radically reshaped environmental conditions.

== History ==
Egyptians, Romans, Babylonians, and early Germans all are recorded as using minerals and/or manure to enhance the productivity of their farms. The use of wood ash as a field treatment became widespread. Although it was previously thought that the concept of fertilizer use may have only dated back 2,000 to 3,000 years, it is now believed that early farmers were using manure to fertilize their crops as long as 8,000 years ago. In the Andes, they used guano for at least 1500 years, before the European countries started importing it in the 19th century for their increasing demands due to the industrial revolution. In this century, "guano" was taken in large quantities from Peru and Chile (and later also from Namibia and other areas) to Europe and the USA, motivating the War of the Pacific between Peru, Chile and Bolivia.

Fish was used as fertilizer, at least as early as 1620.

== Key men in Europe and their inventions ==
=== Johann Fredrich Mayer ===
Johann Friedrich Mayer (1719–1798) was the first to present to the world a series of experiments upon it the relation of gypsum to agriculture, and many chemists have followed him in the 19th century. Early 19th century however a great variety of opinion remained with regard to its mode of operation, for example:

- The French agronomist Victor Yvart (1763–1831) believed that the action of gypsum is exclusively the effect of the sulphuric acid, which enters into its composition; and founds this opinion upon the fact that the ashes of turf, which contain sulphate of iron and sulphate of alumina, have the same action upon vegetation as gypsum.
- The French agronomist Charles Philibert de Lasteyrie (1759–1849), observing that plants whose roots were nearest the surface of the soil were most acted upon by plaster, concludes that gypsum takes from the atmosphere the elements of vegetable life, and transmits them directly to plants.
- Louis Augustin Guillaume Bosc intimates that the septic quality of gypsum (which he takes for granted) best explains its action on vegetation; but this opinion is subverted by the experiments of Davy.
- Humphry Davy found that, of two parcels of minced veal, the one mixed with gypsum, the other left by itself, and both exposed to the action of the sun, the latter was the first to exhibit symptoms of putrefaction. Davy's own belief on this subject is, that it makes part of the food of vegetables, is received into the plant, and combined with it.

Mayer also promote new regimes of crop rotation.

=== Justus von Liebig ===
Chemist Justus von Liebig (1803–1873) contributed greatly to the advancement in the understanding of plant nutrition. His influential works first denounced the Albrecht Thaer theory of humus, arguing first the importance of ammonia, and later promoting the importance of inorganic minerals to plant nutrition. Liebig denied organo-mineral interactions, and confounded plant nutrients with mineral elements. His theories were quickly disproven by the scientific community as a gross simplification, but the intermingling of economic interests with academic research, led to a process of 'knowledge erosion' in the field.

In England, he attempted to implement his theories commercially through a fertilizer created by treating phosphate of lime in bone meal with sulfuric acid. Although it was much less expensive than the guano that was used at the time, it failed because it was not able to be properly absorbed by crops.

=== Sir John Bennet Lawes ===
John Bennet Lawes, an English entrepreneur, began to experiment on the effects of various manures on plants growing in pots in 1837, and a year or two later the experiments were extended to crops in the field. One immediate consequence was that in 1842 he patented a manure formed by treating phosphates with sulphuric acid, and thus was the first to create the artificial manure industry. In the succeeding year he enlisted the services of Joseph Henry Gilbert, who had studied under Liebig at the University of Giessen, as director of research at the Rothamsted Experimental Station which he founded on his estate. To this day, the Rothamsted research station the pair founded still investigates the impact of inorganic and organic fertilizers on crop yields.

=== Jean Baptiste Boussingault ===
In France, Jean Baptiste Boussingault (1802–1887) pointed out that the amount of nitrogen in various kinds of fertilizers is important.

Metallurgists Percy Gilchrist (1851–1935) and Sidney Gilchrist Thomas (1850–1885) invented the Gilchrist–Thomas process, which enabled the use of high phosphorus acidic Continental ores for steelmaking. The dolomite lime lining of the converter turned in time into calcium phosphate, which could be used as fertilizer, known as Thomas-phosphate.

=== The Birkeland-Eyde Process ===
The Birkeland–Eyde process was developed by Norwegian industrialist and scientist Kristian Birkeland along with his business partner Sam Eyde in 1903, based on a method used by Henry Cavendish in 1784. This process was used to fix atmospheric nitrogen (N_{2}) into nitric acid (HNO_{3}), one of several chemical processes generally referred to as nitrogen fixation. The resultant nitric acid was then used for the production of synthetic fertilizer. A factory based on the process was built in Rjukan and Notodden in Norway, combined with the building of large hydroelectric power facilities. The process is inefficient in terms of energy usage, and is today replaced by the Haber process.

=== The Haber Bosch Process ===
In the early decades of the 20th century, the Nobel Prize-winning chemists Carl Bosch of IG Farben and Fritz Haber developed the Haber process which utilized molecular nitrogen (N_{2}) and methane (CH_{4}) gas in an economically sustainable synthesis of ammonia (NH_{3}). The ammonia produced in the Haber process is the main raw material of the Ostwald process.

=== The Ostwald process ===
The Ostwald process is a chemical process for production of nitric acid (HNO_{3}), which was developed by Wilhelm Ostwald (patented 1902). It is a mainstay of the modern chemical industry and provides the raw material for the most common type of fertilizer production, globally (for example, ammonium nitrate, a common fertilizer, is made by reacting ammonia with nitric acid). Historically and practically it is closely associated with the Haber process, which provides the requisite raw material, ammonia (NH_{3}).

=== Erling Johnson ===
In 1927 Erling Johnson developed an industrial method for producing nitrophosphate, also known as the Odda process after his Odda Smelteverk of Norway. The process involved acidifying phosphate rock (from Nauru and Banaba Islands in the southern Pacific Ocean) with nitric acid to produce phosphoric acid and calcium nitrate which, once neutralized, could be used as a nitrogen fertilizer.

== Industry ==
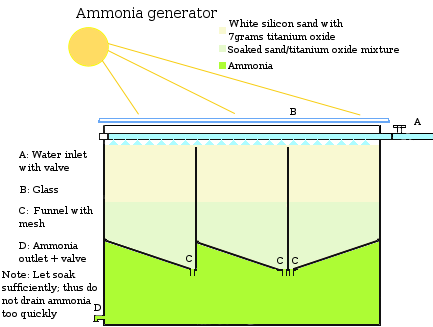
An ammonia generator

=== British ===
The developing sciences of chemistry and Paleontology, combined with the discovery of coprolites in commercial quantities in East Anglia, led Fisons and Packard to develop sulfuric acid and fertilizer plants at Bramford, and Snape, Suffolk in the 1850s to create superphosphates, which were shipped around the world from the port at Ipswich. By 1871 there were about 80 factories making superphosphate.

After World War I these businesses came under competitive pressure from naturally produced guano, primarily found on the Pacific islands, as their extraction and distribution had become economically attractive.

The interwar period saw innovative competition from Imperial Chemical Industries who developed synthetic ammonium sulfate in 1923, Nitro-chalk in 1927, and a more concentrated and economical fertilizer called CCF (Concentrated Complete Fertiliser) based on ammonium phosphate in 1931. Competition was limited as ICI ensured it controlled most of the world's ammonium sulfate supplies.

=== Elsewhere in Europe and North America ===
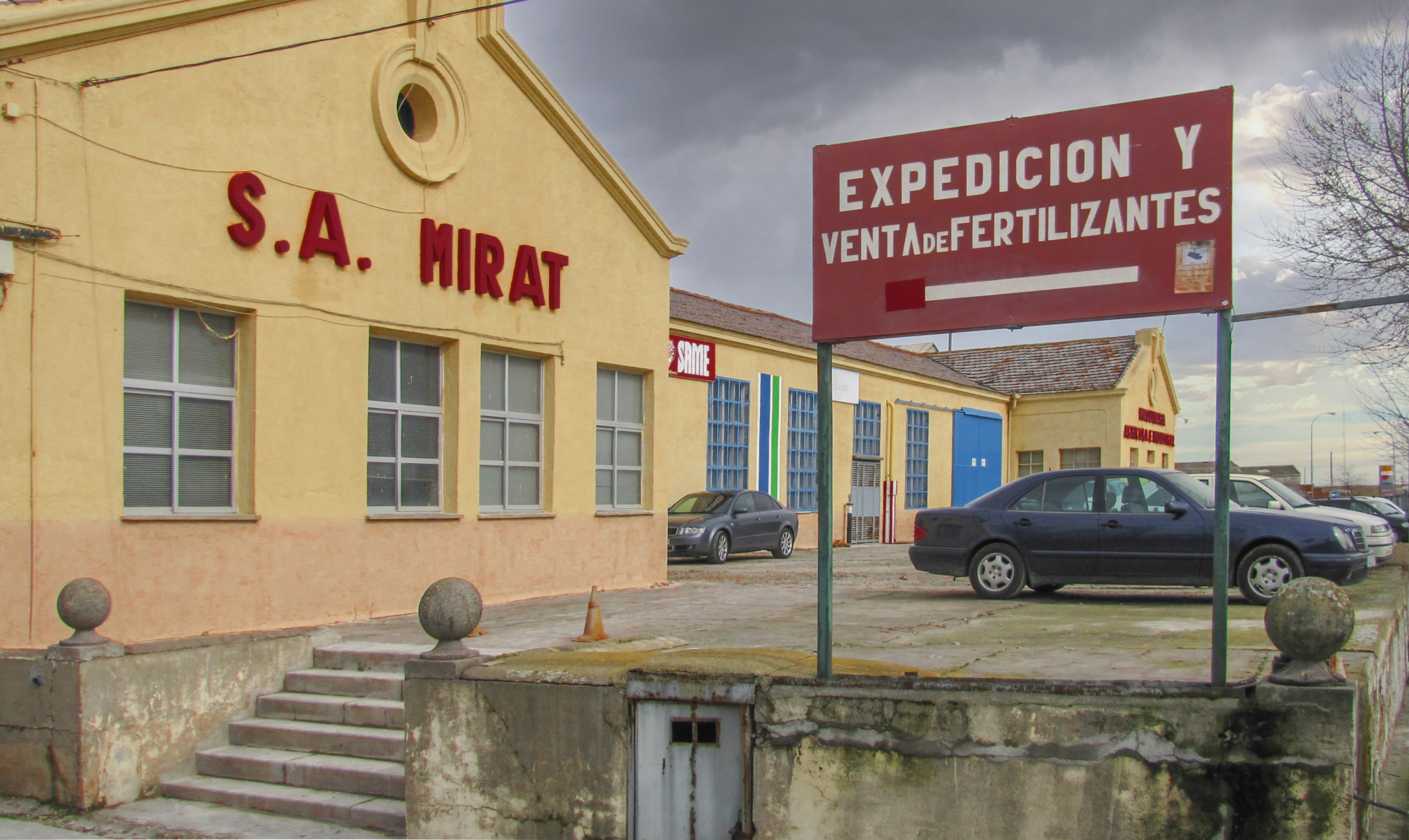
Founded in 1812, Mirat, producer of manures and fertilizers, is claimed to be the oldest industrial business in Salamanca (Spain).

Other European and North American fertilizer companies developed their market share, forcing the English pioneer companies to merge, becoming Fisons, Packard, and Prentice Ltd. in 1929. Together they produced 85,000 tons of superphosphate/year in 1934 from their new factory and deep-water docks in Ipswich. By World War II they had acquired about 40 companies, including Hadfields in 1935, and two years later the large Anglo-Continental Guano Works, founded in 1917.

The post-war environment was characterized by much higher production levels as a result of the "Green Revolution" and new types of seed with increased nitrogen-absorbing potential, notably the high-response varieties of maize, wheat, and rice. This has accompanied the development of strong national competition, accusations of cartels and supply monopolies, and ultimately another wave of mergers and acquisitions. The original names no longer exist other than as holding companies or brand names: Fisons and ICI agrochemicals are part of today's Yara International and AstraZeneca companies.

Major players in this market now include the Russian fertilizer company Uralkali (listed on the London Stock Exchange), whose former majority owner is Dmitry Rybolovlev, ranked by Forbes as 60th in the list of wealthiest people in 2008.

== See also ==
- Fertilizer
- History of agriculture
