= 4949 Akasofu =

Main-belt asteroid

Discovery
- Discovered by: T. Kojima
- Discovery site: YGCO Chiyoda Stn.
- Discovery date: 29 November 1988

Designations
- Named after: Syun-Ichi Akasofu (geophysicist)
- Alternative designations: 1988 WE · 1978 YE; 1981 RL_{5} · 1981 SV_{6}
- Minor planet category: main-belt · Flora

Orbital characteristics
- Epoch 4 September 2017 (JD 2458000.5)
- Uncertainty parameter 0
- Observation arc: 38.45 yr (14,044 days)
- Aphelion: 2.6555 AU
- Perihelion: 1.8904 AU
- Semi-major axis: 2.2729 AU
- Eccentricity: 0.1683
- Orbital period (sidereal): 3.43 yr (1,252 days)
- Mean anomaly: 163.34°
- Mean motion: 0° 17^{m} 15.36^{s} / day
- Inclination: 4.8106°
- Longitude of ascending node: 108.70°
- Argument of perihelion: 275.40°

Physical characteristics
- Dimensions: 4.460±0.181 km 5.67 km (calculated)
- Synodic rotation period: 2.6798±0.0002 h 2.6800±0.0003 h (Note: Pravec (2007): lightcuve plot for (4949) Akasofu, with a rotation period 2.6800±0.0003 hours with a brightness amplitude of 0.15 magnitude. Summary figures at Collaborative Asteroid Lightcurve Link (CALL))
- Geometric albedo: 0.24 (assumed); 0.322±0.055
- Spectral type: S
- Absolute magnitude (H): 13.4 · 13.6 · 13.49±0.14

4949 Akasofu, provisional designation 1988 WE, is a stony Flora asteroid from the inner regions of the asteroid belt, approximately 5 kilometers in diameter. It was discovered by Japanese amateur astronomer Takuo Kojima at the YGCO Chiyoda Station in Japan on 29 November 1988. The asteroid was named for Japanese geophysicist Syun-Ichi Akasofu

== Orbit and classification ==
Akasofu is a member of the Flora family, one of the largest groups of stony asteroids in the main-belt. It orbits the Sun in the inner main-belt at a distance of 1.9–2.7 AU once every 3 years and 5 months (1,252 days). Its orbit has an eccentricity of 0.17 and an inclination of 5° with respect to the ecliptic. In 1978, it was first identified as 1978 YE at the Purple Mountain Observatory, extending the body's observation arc by 10 years prior to its official discovery observation at Chiyoda Station.

== Physical characteristics ==
=== Rotation period ===
According to the survey carried out by the NEOWISE mission of NASA's space-based Wide-field Infrared Survey Explorer, Akasofu measures 4.5 kilometers in diameter and its surface has an albedo of 0.32, while the Collaborative Asteroid Lightcurve Link assumes an intermediate albedo of 0.24 – which derives from 8 Flora, the largest member and namesake of this orbital family – and calculates a diameter of 5.7 kilometers with an absolute magnitude of 13.4.

=== Diameter and albedo ===
In October 2005, a rotational lightcurve of Akasofu was obtained from photometric observations made by David Higgins at Hunters Hill Observatory, Australia. It showed a rotation period of 2.6798 hours with a brightness variation of 0.10 in magnitude (U=3).

Observations by Czech astronomer Petr Pravec in March 2007, gave another well-defined and concurring lightcurve with a period of 2.6800 hours and an amplitude of 0.15 in magnitude (U=3).

== Naming ==
This minor planet was named in honor of Japanese-born geophysicist Syun-Ichi Akasofu (born 1930), professor at University of Alaska Fairbanks. He was the director of the International Arctic Research Center from 1998 to 2007, and is known for studies of the aurora borealis. The official naming citation was published by the Minor Planet Center on 30 March 2010 (M.P.C. 69491).
