= Agrochemical =

Any chemical used in agriculture

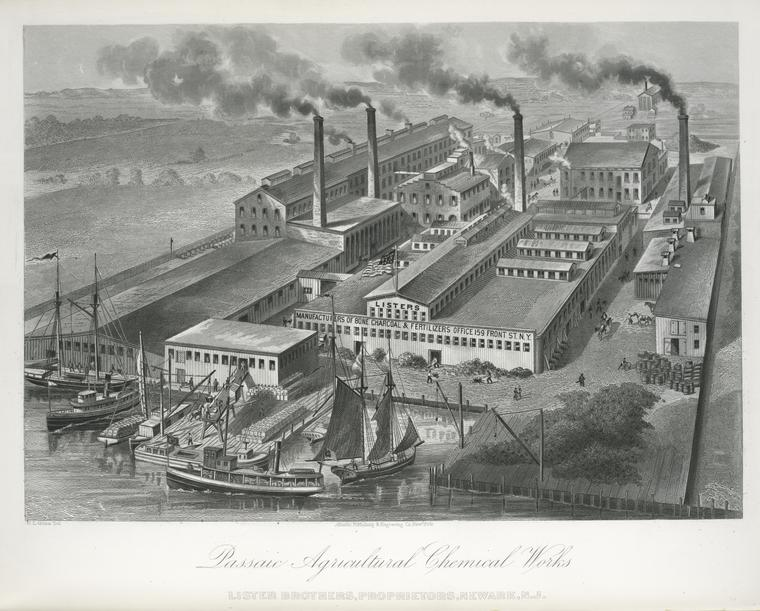
The Passaic Agricultural Chemical Works in Newark, New Jersey, 1876

An agrochemical or agrichemical, a contraction of agricultural chemical, is a chemical product used in conventional or industrial agriculture. Agrochemical typically refers to pesticides and synthetic fertilizers. The term agrochemical is sometimes used informally synonymously with pesticides, sometimes also informally to mean pesticides and fertilizers, and sometimes more correctly to include all chemicals used in agriculture. Other chemicals used in agriculture are plant hormones and plant growth regulators (PGRs), insect attractants, insect repellents, plant defense inducers, herbicide safeners, adjuvents and co-formulants, soil conditioners and soil amendments, liming and acidifying agents. For livestock feed additives, animal growth regulators, anthelmintics and other antiparasitics are used.

== Manufacture ==
Pesticides and fertilizers are manufactured differently. Nitrogen fertilizers are made from ammonia (NH_{3}) produced by the Haber–Bosch process. Potassium and phosphate fertilizers are made from minerals. Most pesticides are made indirectly from petrochemicals, some are made biologically.

== Market and amounts used ==
Total pesticides use in agriculture in 2021 was 3.54 million tonnes of active ingredients.user. In 2018 world pesticide sales were estimated to be $65 billion, of which 88% was used for agriculture. ChemChina (with subsidiaries Syngenta and Adama), Bayer Crop Science, BASF and Corteva Agriscience together represented about 60 per cent of the agricultural pesticide market in 2018.

In 2018 120 million tons (Mt) of nitrogen (elemental), 44 Mt of phosphorus (P_{2}O_{5}), and 45 Mt of potassium (K_{2}O) fertilizers were used. Global sales revenues for inorganic fertilizers in 2018 were reported to be about US$151 billion. In the case of nitrogen and phosphorus, China, the United States, India, and Russia dominate production capacity. Canada is by far the biggest producer of potassium. In each country only a few manufacturers dominate the market, and they are different in each county, and different to the pesticide companies.

Other agrochemicals have smaller sales figures.

== History ==
Compost and manure were used historically as fertilizer. Manufacture of inorganic fertilizers started in the early 20th century, with a huge increase in production over the second half of the 20th century.

Inorganic pesticides were used thousands of years ago in Sumeria and China. The manufacture of organic chemical pesticides started in the middle of the 20th century. The majority of pesticides were developed in the late 20th century, and their use expanded greatly during the Green Revolution.

== Application process ==
Agrochemicals can be applied in several ways. Conventional application methods include foliar sprays, and root drenches, broadcasting of granules, and seed coating.

== Ecological toxicity ==
Agrochemicals, especially when improperly used or released in local environments, have led to a number of public health and environmental issues. Agrochemicals and their production can be significant environmental pollution. Agrochemicals are responsible for significant damage to waterways through runoff, and inproperly stored agrochemicals and agrochemical wastes are responsible for spills, especially during extreme weather events. Following the publication of Rachel Carson's Silent Spring, increased global attention has been paid to these ecological impacts of certain classes of chemicals, both in terms of effects on ecosystems and biodiversity loss.

Many agrochemicals are toxic, and agrochemicals in bulk storage may pose significant environmental and/or health risks, particularly in the event of accidental spills. In many countries, use of agrochemicals is highly regulated. Government-issued permits for purchase and use of approved agrochemicals may be required. Significant penalties can result from misuse, including improper storage resulting in spillage. On farms, proper storage facilities and labeling, emergency clean-up equipment and procedures, and safety equipment and procedures for handling, application and disposal are often subject to mandatory standards and regulations. Usually, the regulations are carried out through the registration process.

For instance, bovine somatotropin, though widely used in the United States, is not approved in Canada and some other jurisdictions as there are concerns for the health of cows using it.

== Alternatives ==
Several systems of farming use reduced amounts or no agrochemicals. They include sustainable agriculture, organic farming, biodynamic farming, agroecology, vertical farming , tillage, polyculture, permaculture, intercropping, regenerative agriculture, organopónicos, hydroponics, nutrient cycling, shifting cultivation, crop rotation, soil steaming, biofumigation, precision agriculture, companion planting, mixed cropping, composting, biological pest control, integrated farming, integrated pest management, mulching, biointensive agriculture, natural farming, plant breeding, genetically modified crops, precision agriculture.

== See also ==
- Index of pesticide articles
- Agricultural chemistry
- Ecocide
- Eutrophication
- National Agricultural Statistics Service (NASS)
- Nutrient pollution
