= Yamaneko =

Yamaneko may refer to:

- Yamaneko Group of Comet Observers (YGCO), a group of astronomical observers based in Japan
- YGCO Chiyoda Station, an astronomical observatory based in Chiyoda, Gunma, Japan, maintained by the YGCO
- 23644 Yamaneko, a minor planet in direct orbit around the Sun; named for the YGCO
- Tropical Storm Yamaneko, a weak storm in the 2022 Pacific typhoon season
- Iriomote cat, called Iriomote-yamaneko (西表山猫, "Iriomote mountain cat") in Japanese
