= 9321 Alexkonopliv =

Asteroid

Discovery
- Discovered by: T. Kojima
- Discovery site: YGCO Chiyoda Stn.
- Discovery date: 5 January 1989

Designations
- Named after: Alex Konopliv (JPL astronomer)
- Alternative designations: 1989 AK · 1977 VZ_{1} 1977 XD · 1984 EK
- Minor planet category: main-belt · (outer) background

Orbital characteristics
- Epoch 4 September 2017 (JD 2458000.5)
- Uncertainty parameter 0
- Observation arc: 39.46 yr (14,413 days)
- Aphelion: 3.9271 AU
- Perihelion: 2.2953 AU
- Semi-major axis: 3.1112 AU
- Eccentricity: 0.2623
- Orbital period (sidereal): 5.49 yr (2,004 days)
- Mean anomaly: 95.027°
- Mean motion: 0° 10^{m} 46.56^{s} / day
- Inclination: 4.3189°
- Longitude of ascending node: 89.167°
- Argument of perihelion: 358.09°

Physical characteristics
- Dimensions: 10.28±0.19 km 11.48 km (calculated)
- Synodic rotation period: 3.4268±0.0010 h
- Geometric albedo: 0.057 (assumed); 0.116±0.023
- Spectral type: C
- Absolute magnitude (H): 13.0 · 12.93±0.18 · 12.90 · 12.979±0.002 (R) · 13.43

9321 Alexkonopliv, provisional designation 1989 AK, is a carbonaceous background asteroid from the outer region of the asteroid belt, approximately 11 kilometers in diameter.

The asteroid was discovered on 5 January 1989, by Japanese astronomer Takuo Kojima at the YGCO Chiyoda Station, Japan. It was named for JPL-scientist Alex Konopliv.

== Orbit and classification ==
Alexkonopliv is a non-family asteroid from the main belt's background population. It orbits the Sun in the outer asteroid belt at a distance of 2.3–3.9 AU once every 5 years and 6 months (2,004 days). Its orbit has an eccentricity of 0.26 and an inclination of 4° with respect to the ecliptic. In November 1977, it was first identified as 1977 VZ_{1} at the Purple Mountain Observatory, China, extending the body's observation arc by 12 years prior to its official discovery observation at Chiyoda Station.

== Naming ==
This minor planet was named after JPL-scientist Alex Konopliv (born 1960), an internationally recognized authority on the measurement of the gravitational field of Solar System bodies tracked by satellites in Earth's orbit. Various Mars missions used his gravity field determinations for the Red Planet. The official naming citation was published by the Minor Planet Center on 5 October 1998 (M.P.C. 32610).

== Physical characteristics ==
=== Rotation period ===
In December 2010, a rotational lightcurve of Alexkonopliv was obtained from photometric observation at the Palomar Transient Factory in California. Lightcurve analysis gave a rotation period of 3.4268 hours with a brightness variation of 0.19 magnitude (U=2).

=== Diameter and albedo ===
According to the survey carried out by NASA's space-based Wide-field Infrared Survey Explorer with its subsequent NEOWISE mission, Alexkonopliv measures 10.3 kilometers in diameter and its surface has an albedo of 0.116, while the Collaborative Asteroid Lightcurve Link assumes a standard albedo for carbonaceous asteroids of 0.057 and calculates a diameter of 11.5 kilometers with an absolute magnitude of 13.43.
