= Banknotes of the Norwegian krone =

Norwegian banknotes are circulated, in addition to Norwegian coins, with a denomination of Norwegian kroner, as standard units of currency in Norway. From 1877, after the establishment of the Scandinavian Monetary Union, Norwegian banknotes of 1000, 500, 200, 100, 50, 10 and 5 kroner have been put into circulation. The first 200 kroner banknote was first published in 1994. The others have been in use since 1877. Banknotes of 5 and 10 kroner were in use until 1963 and 1983 when they were replaced by coins.

From 1917 to 1925 and 1940-1950 there was a shortage of small change, and 1 and 2 kroner banknotes were printed as "arbitration coins banknotes." The first edition was canceled in 1926, while the second edition was formally valid right up to 1999.

== History ==
From 1877, after the establishment of the Scandinavian Monetary Union, and until the present day, Norwegian banknotes have included 1000, 500, 100, and 50 kroner notes. In 1994 the first 200 kroner note was issued. 5 and 10 kroner notes were also used from 1877, but these were replaced by coins in 1963 and 1983 respectively.

During World War I and World War II and their aftermaths of 1917–1925 and 1940–1950, there was a shortage of change, so 1 krone and 2 kroner notes were printed as "coin notes". The World War I edition was rendered invalid in 1926, whereas the World War II edition technically remained legal tender until 1999.

== Current banknotes ==
The current design of Series VIII was introduced on 30 May 2017, with plans to be fully implemented by the fourth quarter of 2019. The designs are by The Metric System and Snøhetta and use an abstract geometric design influenced by the Beaufort scale.

=== Series VIII (2017 – present) ===
| Value | Valid from | Invalid | Theme: "The Sea" - Main obverse motif | Theme: "The Sea" - Main reverse motif |
|---|---|---|---|---|
| 1,000 kr | 14 November 2019 | - | Motif: Wave in the sea. Signal flag: Letter E. | Pixel motif: Horizon. Cubic pattern: 20.8 m/s. Organic pattern: Strong gale. High waves. Dense foam is blown along wind direction. |
| 500 kr | 18 October 2018 | - | Colin Archer, boat design. Anders Beer Wilse, photographer. Linn Krogh Hansen, photographer. Signal flag: Letter G. | Pixel motif on the horizon: Oil platform. Cubic pattern: 13.9 m/s. Organic pattern: High wind. Sea heaps up, white foam from breaking waves. |
| 200 kr | 30 May 2017 | - | Motif: Cod and herring. The background drawing shows mesh from a fishing net. Signal flag: Letter N. | Pixel motif on the horizon: Fishing boat. Cubic pattern: 8 m/s. Organic pattern: Fresh breeze. Wave heights of 1 m or more. |
| 100 kr | 30 May 2017 | - | Motif: The Gokstad ship from the 800s, with the Norwegian-designed X-Bow hull developed by Ulstein Design & Solutions AS in the background. Signal flag: Letter O. | Pixel motif on the horizon: Cargo ship. Cubic pattern: 3.4 m/s. Organic pattern: Gentle breeze. Crests begin to break. |
| 50 kr | 18 October 2018 | - | Motif: Utvær Lighthouse in Sogn og Fjordane, Norway's westernmost point. Signal flag: Letter R. | Pixel motif on the horizon: Lighthouse on the horizon. Cubic pattern: 1.6 metres per second (m/s). Organic pattern: Light breeze, gentle waves. |

Series VIII banknotes are printed by Oberthur Fiduciaire in France. Banknote order quantities

| Value | 2016 | 2017 | 2018 | 2019 | 2020 |
|---|---|---|---|---|---|
| 1,000 kr | 0 | 0 | 0 | - | - |
| 500 kr | 0 | 0 | 75,610,000 | - | - |
| 200 kr | 4,440,000 | 82,480,000 | 0 | - | - |
| 100 kr | 260,000 | 67,200,000 | 0 | - | - |
| 50 kr | 0 | 51,340,000 | 0 | - | - |
| total | 4,700,000 | 201,020,000 | 75,610,000 | - | - |

== Historical banknotes ==
All Norwegian notes issued since 1877 are listed below in reverse chronological order. The notes have been issued in series starting with series I in 1877 and going on series VII from 1994. As of 2012 only series VII is in circulation, while series VI is convertible at the central bank until 1 November 2012.

The world wars created a great need for cash. In 1917 a law was passed to allow for 1 krone and 2 kroner "coin notes" in response to a pledge from the Bank of Norway to the Ministry of Finance:

The board of directors at the Bank of Norway has in writing on the 8th September 1917 informed the Ministry that the shortage of change has now become outright intolerable. One company after another complain that they cannot arrange the agreed salaries for their workers, and the merchants cannot change their customers' banknotes.

Subsequently, coin notes were printed until 1925 but were invalidated already in 1926 when the economy had stabilized after World War I. Coin notes of 1 krone and 2 kroner were also printed during World War II (1940−45) and up until 1950. These were not invalidated after the war. However, the complete series II printed 1901−45 was rendered invalid on 9 September 1945 and those who could not readily justify their amount of cash were only given limited compensation in new money. This was done to diminish the impact of war profiteering.

5 kroner and 10 kroner notes were used from 1877 but were replaced by coins in 1963 and 1983, respectively, based on cost-benefit analyses. Apart from the World War I coin notes in 1926 and the series II notes in 1945, all Norwegian banknotes from series I through series V, including 5 kroner and 10 kroner notes, plus the World War II coin notes, were technically valid – i.e. convertible at the Bank of Norway – all the way until 1998 (series I) and 1999 (series III, IV, V, and the World War II coin notes). The 1000 kroner and 500 kroner notes of series V were valid until 2001 and 2002 respectively.

=== Series VII (1994−2020) ===
| Value | Printed | Invalid | Main obverse motif | Main reverse motif |
|---|---|---|---|---|
| 1,000 kr | 2001−2019 | 2020 | Edvard Munch, painter | Excerpt from Munch's wall painting The Sun |
| 500 kr | 1999−2018 | 2019 | Sigrid Undset, author, Nobel laureate | A wreath symbolising volume 1 The Wreath from Undset's trilogy Kristin Lavransdatter |
| 200 kr | 1994−2017 | 2018 | Kristian Birkeland, scientist | The North Pole region with aurora borealis and Birkeland currents |
| 100 kr | 1995−2017 | 2018 | Kirsten Flagstad, opera singer | Main hall of Folketeatret, formerly the venue of the Norwegian National Opera |
| 50 kr | 1996−2018 | 2019 | Peter Christen Asbjørnsen, folktale collector | Water lilies in tarn, inspired by the folktale Summer night in Krogskoven |

50 kroner note (outdated)

50 kroner (2003), obverse

50 kroner note (2003), reverse

The 50 kroner note (1997) portrays Peter Christen Asbjørnsen (1812–1885), writer and collector of Norwegian folktales. Since 1999 the serial number has been printed with ultraviolet fluorescence. The previous edition (1984), no longer valid, portrays Aasmund Olavsson Vinje (1818–1879), poet, author, and proponent of Nynorsk. This was the first Norwegian banknote featuring the Nynorsk name of Norway, Noreg (compare with Bokmål: Norge).

The wear and tear on the 50 kroner notes has become so harsh in recent years, possibly from people not regarding them as very valuable any more, so that their maintenance cost is becoming a problem for the Bank of Norway. The 50 kroner note may well be replaced by a 50 kroner coin in the not too distant future.

100 kroner note (outdated)

100 kroner (1995), obverse

100 kroner (1995), reverse

The 100 kroner note (1997) portrays Kirsten Flagstad (1895–1962), opera singer and first director of the Norwegian National Opera. In 2003 this note was upgraded with a holographic metal foil stripe. The previous edition (1979), no longer valid, was the first Norwegian banknote featuring a woman: Camilla Collett (1813–1895), author, feminist activist, sister of Henrik Wergeland (author and poet), and daughter of Nicolai Wergeland (priest and co-founder of the Norwegian constitution). Camilla actually replaced her brother on the 100 kroner note, where he had been the motif since 1949.

200 kroner note (outdated)

200 kroner (2002), obverse

200 kroner (2002), reverse

After considerable inflation during the 1970s and 1980s, there was need for a denomination between 100 kroner and 1000 kroner in addition to 500 kroner, and so the first Norwegian 200 kroner note was issued in 1994. It portrays Kristian Birkeland (1867–1917), magnetism researcher, inventor, and co-founder of Norsk Hydro. In 2002 this note was upgraded with a holographic metal foil stripe.

The front of the 200 kroner note shows a portrait of Kristian Birkeland against a stylized pattern of the aurora borealis and a very large snowflake. Birkeland's terrella experiment, which consisted of a small, magnetized sphere representing the Earth suspended in an evacuated box, is shown on the left. When subjected to an electron beam a glow of light would appear around the magnetic poles of the terrella, simulating the aurora.

The back of the 200 kroner note shows a map of the north polar regions including Scandinavia to the right and northern Canada to the left. A ring encircling the magnetic dip pole (located near Resolute, Canada) symbolizes the location of auroral phenomena including the satellite-determined statistical location of Birkeland currents. Birkeland's original depiction of field-aligned currents published in 1908 is shown in the lower right corner.

500 kroner note (outdated)

500 kroner (1999), obverse

500 kroner (1999), reverse

The 500 kroner note (1999) portrays Sigrid Undset (1882–1949), author and winner of the Nobel Prize in Literature in 1927. The note features a holographic metal foil stripe and other security measures. The previous edition (1991), no longer valid, portrays Edvard Grieg (1843–1907), world-renowned national romantic composer and pianist.

The use of the 500 kroner note has increased in recent years, especially after it was introduced to automatic teller machines along with the 200 kroner note. Conversely, the 100 kroner note has been partly displaced from ATMs, and its use has decreased.

1000 kroner note (outdated)

1000 kroner (2001), obverse

1000 kroner (2001), reverse

The 1000 kroner note (2001) portrays Edvard Munch (1863–1944), expressionist painter and graphic artist. The note features a holographic metal foil stripe and other security measures. The previous edition (1990), no longer valid, portrays Christian Magnus Falsen (1782–1830), a co-founder of the Norwegian constitution.

The most valuable Norwegian banknote has always been the 1000 kroner note, but its value has greatly decreased since the early twentieth century. In the 100 years from 1904 to 2004, the value of 1000 kroner decreased by roughly 5,500 per cent. While in 1904 1000 kroner could be used to purchase more than 4000 loaves of bread, in 2004 it could buy no more than 70 loaves. (The price of a standard loaf of bread in 2004 was approximately 15 kroner; the consumer price index in said period increased from 2.0 to 113.3.)

=== Series VI (1979–2001) ===
| Value | Printed | Invalid | Main obverse motif | Main reverse motif |
|---|---|---|---|---|
| 1,000 kr | 1990−2001 | 2012 | Christian Magnus Falsen, constitution co-founder | 17th century oven plate |
| 500 kr | 1991−2000 | 2012 | Edvard Grieg, composer, pianist | Old flower ornament |
| 100 kr | 1979−97 | 2012 | Camilla Collett, author | 15th century silver buckle |
| 50 kr | 1985−97 | 2012 | Aasmund Olavsson Vinje, author, poet | Detail from the Hylestad church portal |

=== Series V (1962-1985) ===
| Value | Printed | Invalid | Main obverse motif | Main reverse motif |
|---|---|---|---|---|
| 1,000 kr | 1975−81 | 2001 | Henrik Ibsen, playwright | Peder Balke's painting Lighthouse at Vardø |
| 500 kr | 1978−85 | 2002 | Niels Henrik Abel, mathematician | Original main buildings of the University of Oslo |
| 100 kr | 1962−77 | 1999 | Henrik Wergeland, author, poet | Oscar Wergeland's painting Constituent Assembly at Eidsvoll |
| 50 kr | 1966−83 | 1999 | Bjørnstjerne Bjørnson, author, Nobel laureate | Borgund stave church |
| 10 kr | 1972−84 | 1999 | Fridtjof Nansen, humanist, Nobel laureate | Nils Flakstad's sculpture The Fisherman |

=== Series IV (1948-1976) ===
| Value | Printed | Invalid | Main obverse motif | Main reverse motif |
|---|---|---|---|---|
| 1,000 kr | 1949−75 | 1999 | Henrik Ibsen, playwright | Edvard Munch's painting The Tale |
| 500 kr | 1948−76 | 1999 | Niels Henrik Abel, mathematician | Purpose-made industrial motif by Reidar Aulie |
| 100 kr | 1949−62 | 1999 | Henrik Wergeland, author, poet | Erik Werenskiold's painting Timber Rafters |
| 50 kr | 1950−65 | 1999 | Bjørnstjerne Bjørnson, author, Nobel laureate | Hugo Lous Mohr's painting Harvesting Cereal |
| 10 kr | 1954−73 | 1999 | Christian Michelsen, shipowner, Prime Minister 1905−1907 | Ships making headway, from drawing by Henrik Sørensen, and the god Mercury |
| 5 kr | 1955−63 | 1999 | Fridtjof Nansen, humanist, Nobel laureate | Fishing village in Lofoten, from painting by Axel Revold |

=== Series III (1945-1955) ===
| Value | Printed | Invalid | Main obverse motif | Main reverse motif |
|---|---|---|---|---|
| 1,000 kr | 1945−49 | 1999 | Wilhelm Frimann Koren Christie, Speaker of the Storting 1815 and 1818 | Nidaros Cathedral |
| 100 kr | 1945−50 | 1999 | Norwegian Coat of Arms | «Bank of Norway» and denomination |
| 50 kr | 1945−51 | 1999 | Norwegian Coat of Arms | «Bank of Norway» and denomination |
| 10 kr | 1945−54 | 1999 | Norwegian Coat of Arms | Denomination |
| 5 kr | 1945−55 | 1999 | Norwegian Coat of Arms | «Bank of Norway» and denomination |

==== "Coin notes" (1940-1950) ====
| Value | Printed | Invalid | Main obverse motif | Main reverse motif |
|---|---|---|---|---|
| 2 kr | 1940−50 | 1999 | «Bank of Norway» and denomination | Denomination |
| 1 kr | 1940−50 | 1999 | «Bank of Norway» and denomination | Denomination |

=== Series II (1901-1945) ===
| Value | Printed | Invalid | Main obverse motif | Main reverse motif |
|---|---|---|---|---|
| 1,000 kr | 1901−45 | 1945 | Wilhelm Frimann Koren Christie and Peter Wessel Tordenskiold, admiral | Nidaros Cathedral in Trondheim |
| 500 kr | 1901−45 | 1945 | Christie | Akershus Castle in Oslo |
| 100 kr | 1901−45 | 1945 | Christie and Tordenskiold | Haakon's Hall in Bergen |
| 50 kr | 1901−45 | 1945 | Christie | Constituent Assembly Building at Eidsvoll |
| 10 kr | 1901−45 | 1945 | Christie and Tordenskiold | An Olav Rose |
| 5 kr | 1901−45 | 1945 | Christie | An Olav Rose |

==== "Coin notes" (1917-1925) ====
| Value | Printed | Invalid | Main obverse motif | Main reverse motif |
|---|---|---|---|---|
| 2 kr | 1918−25 | 1926 | «Bank of Norway» and denomination | Norwegian Coat of Arms on an Olav Rose |
| 1 kr | 1917−25 | 1926 | «Bank of Norway» and denomination | Norwegian Coat of Arms on an Olav Rose |

=== Series I (1877–1901) ===
| Value | Printed | Invalid | Main obverse motif | Main reverse motif |
|---|---|---|---|---|
| 1,000 kr | 1877−1901 | 1918 | Oscar II, king of Sweden and Norway | Denomination |
| 500 kr | 1877−1901 | 1918 | Oscar II, king of Sweden and Norway | Denomination |
| 100 kr | 1877−1901 | 1918 | Oscar II, king of Sweden and Norway | Denomination |
| 50 kr | 1877−1901 | 1918 | Oscar II, king of Sweden and Norway | Denomination |
| 10 kr | 1877−1901 | 1918 | Oscar II, king of Sweden and Norway | Denomination |
| 5 kr | 1877−1901 | 1918 | Oscar II, king of Sweden and Norway | Denomination |

Source: Bank of Norway
