= (7563) 1988 BC =

Asteroid

Discovery
- Discovered by: T. Kojima
- Discovery site: YGCO Chiyoda Stn.
- Discovery date: 16 January 1988

Designations
- Alternative designations: 1991 VJ_{5}
- Minor planet category: main-belt · (middle) background

Orbital characteristics
- Epoch 23 March 2018 (JD 2458200.5)
- Uncertainty parameter 0
- Observation arc: 30.03 yr (10,969 d)
- Aphelion: 3.2894 AU
- Perihelion: 2.0689 AU
- Semi-major axis: 2.6792 AU
- Eccentricity: 0.2278
- Orbital period (sidereal): 4.39 yr (1,602 d)
- Mean anomaly: 299.98°
- Mean motion: 0° 13^{m} 29.28^{s} / day
- Inclination: 12.678°
- Longitude of ascending node: 83.534°
- Argument of perihelion: 52.920°

Physical characteristics
- Mean diameter: 12.04±3.52 km 13.93±0.10 km 15.857±0.103 km 16.134±0.099 km 17.27±0.64 km
- Synodic rotation period: 6.539±0.005 h
- Geometric albedo: 0.0483; 0.06; 0.073; 0.078; 0.078±0.015; 0.08
- Spectral type: S (assumed)
- Absolute magnitude (H): 12.30; 12.70; 12.8; 12.90

(7563) 1988 BC is a background asteroid from the central region of the asteroid belt, approximately 16 kilometers (10 miles) in diameter. It was discovered on 16 January 1988, by Japanese amateur astronomer Takuo Kojima at the YGCO Chiyoda Station in the Kantō region of Japan. The asteroid has a rotation period of 6.5 hours.

== Classification and orbit ==
1988 BC is a non-family asteroid of the main belt's background population. It orbits the Sun in the central asteroid belt at a distance of 2.1–3.3 AU once every 4 years and 5 months (1,602 days; semi-major axis of 2.68 AU). Its orbit has an eccentricity of 0.23 and an inclination of 13° with respect to the ecliptic.

== Naming ==
As of 2018, 1988 BC remains unnamed.

== Physical characteristics ==
=== Lightcurves ===
In January 2010, a rotational lightcurve of 1988 BC was obtained from photometric observations by Pierre Antonini at the Bédoin Observatory (132) in southeastern France. Lightcurve analysis gave a rotation period of 6.539±0.005 hours with a brightness variation of 0.30 in magnitude (U=3). A previous 2006-observation by American astronomer Brian Warner at his Palmer Divide Observatory in Colorado gave a period of 6.510 hours and an amplitude of 0.24 magnitude (U=3-).

=== Diameter and albedo ===
According to the surveys carried out by the Japanese Akari satellite and the NEOWISE mission of NASA's Wide-field Infrared Survey Explorer, the asteroid has a low albedo of between 0.048 and 0.08, with a diameter between 12.04 and 17.27 kilometers.

Despite the results from the space-based observations, the Collaborative Asteroid Lightcurve Link assumes a higher albedo of 0.10 – a compromise between the stony and carbonaceous asteroid populations from the inner and outer main-belt, respectively – and hence calculates a smaller diameter of 12.1 kilometers with an absolute magnitude of 12.7.
