= 7517 Alisondoane =

Main-belt asteroid

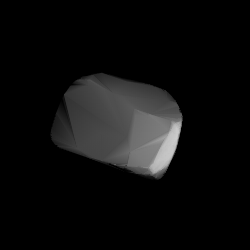
- Alisondoane modeled from its lightcurve

Discovery
- Discovered by: T. Kojima
- Discovery site: Chiyoda
- Discovery date: 3 January 1989

Designations
- Named after: Alison Doane (curator at Harvard Obs.)
- Alternative designations: 1989 AD · 1938 UV; 1961 VJ · 1980 TF_{7} 1982 FU_{3}
- Minor planet category: main-belt · (inner); background

Orbital characteristics
- Epoch 4 September 2017 (JD 2458000.5)
- Uncertainty parameter 0
- Observation arc: 55.49 yr (20,268 days)
- Aphelion: 3.0881 AU
- Perihelion: 1.8040 AU
- Semi-major axis: 2.4461 AU
- Eccentricity: 0.2625
- Orbital period (sidereal): 3.83 yr (1,397 days)
- Mean anomaly: 197.29°
- Inclination: 6.0528°
- Longitude of ascending node: 0.6039°
- Argument of perihelion: 55.673°

Physical characteristics
- Mean diameter: 8.52±2.25 km 9.146±0.207 km 9.3±0.9 km 9.31±0.56 km 9.99±1.92 km
- Synodic rotation period: 9.701±0.001 h (Note: Pravec (2007): rotation period 9.701±0.001 hours with a brightness amplitude of 1.13 mag. CALL assigns a "Quality Code" of 3, which denotes a secure result within the precision given and no ambiguity. Summary figures for (7517) Alisondoane at Collaborative Asteroid Lightcurve Link (CALL))
- Pole ecliptic latitude: (123.0°, −51.0°) (λ_{1}/β_{1}); (314.0°, −60.0°) (λ_{2}/β_{2})
- Geometric albedo: 0.04±0.01; 0.07±0.01; 0.08±0.05; 0.1215±0.0179; 0.128±0.018
- Spectral type: C (Pan-STARRS); C (SDSS-MOC)
- Absolute magnitude (H): 13.1 · 13.43±0.33 · 13.70 · 13.8 · 14.19

7517 Alisondoane (prov. designation: 1989 AD) is a dark background asteroid from the inner regions of the asteroid belt. It was discovered on 3 January 1989, by Japanese amateur astronomer Takuo Kojima at the YGCO Chiyoda Station in the northern Kantō region of Japan. The carbonaceous C-type asteroid has a rotation period of 9.7 hours and measures approximately 9 kilometers (5.6 miles) in diameter. It was named after Alison Doane (1958–2017), curator of astronomical photographs at the Harvard College Observatory.

== Orbit and classification ==
Alisondoane is a non-family asteroid of the main belt's background population when applying the hierarchical clustering method to its proper orbital elements. It orbits the Sun in the inner main-belt at a distance of 1.8–3.1 AU once every 3 years and 10 months (1,397 days). Its orbit has an eccentricity of 0.26 and an inclination of 6° with respect to the ecliptic.

== Naming ==
This minor planet was named in honor of Alison Doane (1958–2017), curator of astronomical photographs at the Harvard College Observatory. She was also principal oboe with the Boston Philharmonic Orchestra from 1982 to 2001. The official naming citation was published by the Minor Planet Center on 25 December 2015 (M.P.C. 97567).

== Physical characteristics ==
Alisondoane has been characterized as a carbonaceous C-type asteroid by PanSTARRS photometric survey, as well as by the Sloan Digital Sky Survey (SDSS).

=== Lightcurves ===
A rotational lightcurve analysis by Czech astronomer Petr Pravec in 2007 rendered a rotation period of 9.701±0.001 hours with a high brightness amplitude of 1.13 in magnitude (U=3). A modeled lightcurves using photometric data from various sources, gave a sidereal period of 9.70943 hours and two spin axes of (123.0°, −51.0°) and (314.0°, −60.0°) in ecliptic coordinates (λ, β).

=== Diameter and albedo ===
According to the surveys carried out by the Japanese Akari satellite and NASA's Wide-field Infrared Survey Explorer with its subsequent NEOWISE mission, Alisondoane measures between 8.52 and 9.99 kilometers in diameter and its surface has an albedo between 0.04 and 0.122. The Collaborative Asteroid Lightcurve Link (CALL) calculates a smaller diameter of 5.16 kilometers based on an assumed albedo of 0.18 for an X-type asteroid. (Note: Summary Notes by the LCDB: "The Masi et al. paper gave this as a C-type on the basis of a neutral spectrum. However, given its location in the inner main belt, we adopted class X and a Pv = 0.18")
