= Birkeland current =

Currents flowing along geomagnetic field lines

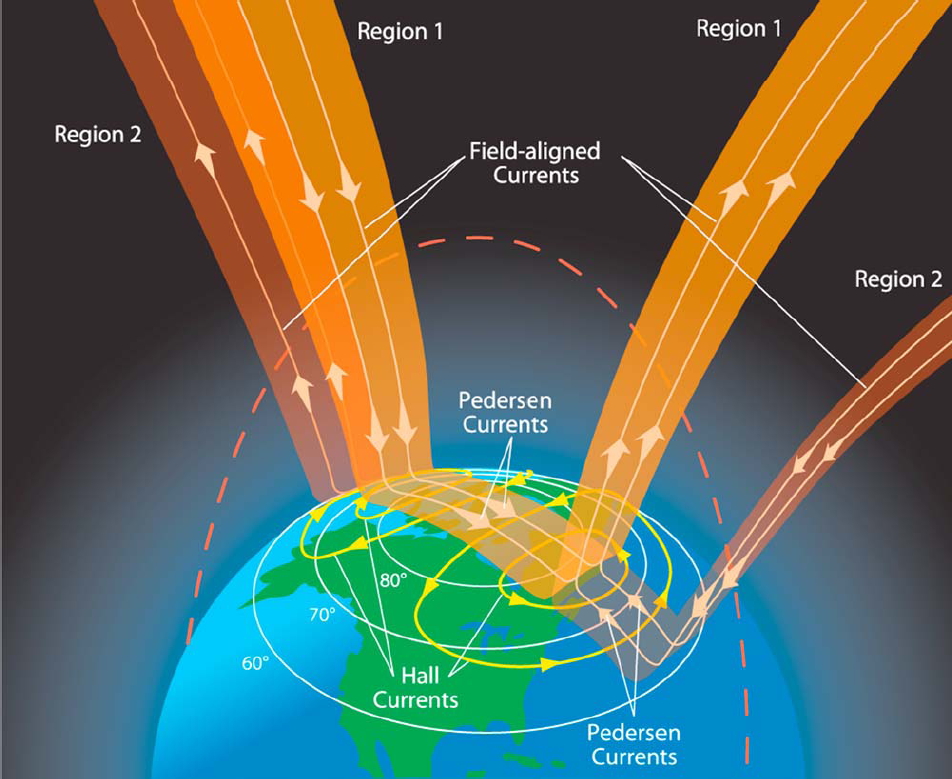
Schematic of the Birkeland or Field-Aligned Currents and the ionospheric current systems they connect to, Pedersen and Hall currents.

A Birkeland current (also known as field-aligned current, FAC) is a set of electrical currents that flow along geomagnetic field lines connecting the Earth's magnetosphere to the Earth's high latitude ionosphere. In the Earth's magnetosphere, the currents are driven by the solar wind and interplanetary magnetic field (IMF) and by bulk motions of plasma through the magnetosphere (convection indirectly driven by the interplanetary environment). The strength of the Birkeland currents changes with activity in the magnetosphere (e.g. during substorms). Small scale variations in the upward current sheets (downward flowing electrons) accelerate magnetospheric electrons which, when they reach the upper atmosphere, create the Auroras Borealis and Australis.

In the high latitude ionosphere (or auroral zones), the Birkeland currents close through the region of the auroral electrojet, which flows perpendicular to the local magnetic field in the ionosphere. The Birkeland currents occur in two pairs of field-aligned current sheets. One pair extends from noon through the dusk sector to the midnight sector. The other pair extends from noon through the dawn sector to the midnight sector. The sheet on the high latitude side of the auroral zone is referred to as the Region 1 current sheet and the sheet on the low latitude side is referred to as the Region 2 current sheet. Together with the (partial) ring current, Region 1 and Region 2 currents form the convection circuit, which is associated with the Dungey cycle. On the day-side, around noon, another type of FAC can be found: Region 0 currents, going into and out of the ionospheric polar cap, the direction of which is decided by the direction of the IMF.

The currents were predicted in 1908 by Norwegian explorer and physicist Kristian Birkeland, who undertook expeditions north of the Arctic Circle to study the aurora. He rediscovered, using simple magnetic field measurement instruments, that when the aurora appeared the needles of magnetometers changed direction, confirming the findings of Anders Celsius and assistant Olof Hjorter more than a century before. This could only imply that currents were flowing in the atmosphere above. He theorized that somehow the Sun emitted a cathode ray, and corpuscles from what is now known as a solar wind entered the Earth's magnetic field and created currents, thereby creating the aurora. This view was scorned by other researchers, but in 1967 a satellite, launched into the auroral region, showed that the currents posited by Birkeland existed. In honour of him and his theory these currents are named Birkeland currents. A good description of the discoveries by Birkeland is given in the book by Jago.

Professor Emeritus of the Alfvén Laboratory in Sweden, Carl-Gunne Fälthammar wrote: "A reason why Birkeland currents are particularly interesting is that, in the plasma forced to carry them, they cause a number of plasma physical processes to occur (waves, instabilities, fine structure formation). These in turn lead to consequences such as acceleration of charged particles, both positive and negative, and element separation (such as preferential ejection of oxygen ions). Both of these classes of phenomena should have a general astrophysical interest far beyond that of understanding the space environment of our own Earth."

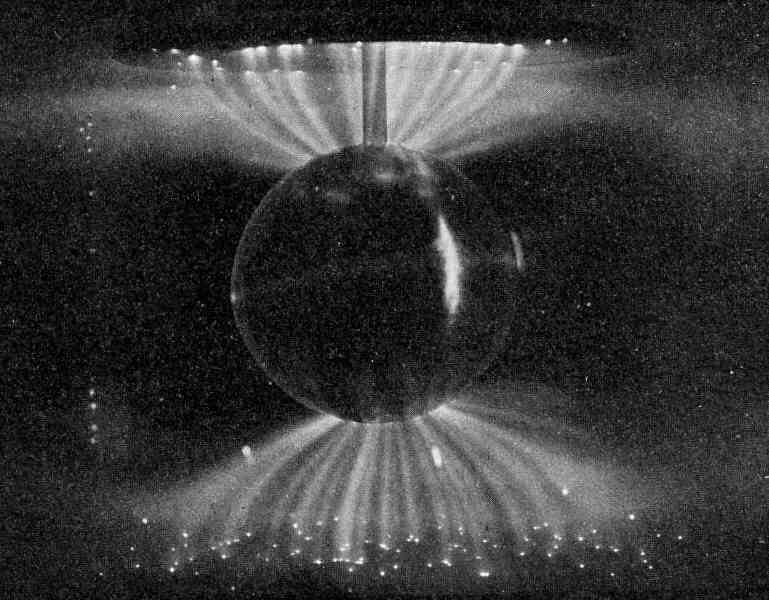
Auroral-like Birkeland currents created by scientist Kristian Birkeland in his terrella, featuring a magnetised anode globe in an evacuated chamber.

== Characteristics ==
Auroral Birkeland currents carry about 100,000 amperes during quiet times and more than 1 million amperes during geomagnetically disturbed times. Birkeland had estimated currents "at heights of several hundred kilometres, and strengths of up to a million amperes" in 1908. The ionospheric currents that connect the field-aligned currents give rise to Joule heating in the upper atmosphere. The heat is transferred from the ionospheric plasma to the gas of the upper atmosphere, which consequently rises and increases drag on low-altitude satellites.

Birkeland currents can also be created in the laboratory with multi-terawatt pulsed power generators. The resulting cross-section pattern indicates a hollow beam of electrons in the form of a circle of vortices, a formation called the diocotron instability (similar to the Kelvin–Helmholtz instability), that subsequently leads to filamentation. Such vortices can be seen in aurora as "auroral curls".

Birkeland currents are also one of a class of plasma phenomena called a z-pinch, so named because the azimuthal magnetic fields produced by the current pinches the current into a filamentary cable. This can also twist, producing a helical pinch that spirals like a twisted or braided rope, and this most closely corresponds to a Birkeland current. Pairs of parallel Birkeland currents will also interact due to Ampère's force law: parallel Birkeland currents moving in the same direction will attract each other with an electromagnetic force inversely proportional to their distance apart whilst parallel Birkeland currents moving in opposite directions will repel each other. There is also a short-range circular component to the force between two Birkeland currents that is opposite to the longer-range parallel forces.

Electrons moving along a Birkeland current may be accelerated by a plasma double layer. If the resulting electrons approach the speed of light, they may subsequently produce a Bennett pinch, which in a magnetic field causes the electrons to spiral and emit synchrotron radiation that may include radio, visible light, x-rays, and gamma rays.

== Spatial distribution and responses to solar wind disturbances ==
Auroral Birkeland currents are constrained along the geomagnetic field. Therefore, the current’s distribution in 3-dimensional space could be largely described using the 2-dimensional distribution of the current’s footprints at a given altitude in the ionosphere, e.g., 110 km. A classical 2-dimensional description was summarized from satellite observations by Iijima and Potemra. The footprints of Auroral Birkeland currents exhibit ring-shaped structures. As the currents are driven by the solar wind, their spatial distribution and intensity are also dynamically moderated by solar wind disturbances. Under intensive solar wind disturbances, the rings can quickly shift by 10 degrees in latitude in about 10 minutes. The latitudinal shift takes on average 20 minutes to respond to a solar wind change during the daytime but 70–90 minutes at night.

The field-aligned current density at its ionopsheric footprints (about110 km altitude) on 4 June 2007, a day under moderate solar wind disturbances, predicted by the open-source MFACE, according to the solar wind conditions downloaded from the NASA OMNI serve. MFACE is an empirical mode extracted from 10-years of CHAMP magnetic observations. The time interval between neighboring frames in this movie denotes 5 minutes. Similar movies but under quiet and active solar wind disturbance levels are available at, e.g.,.

== History ==
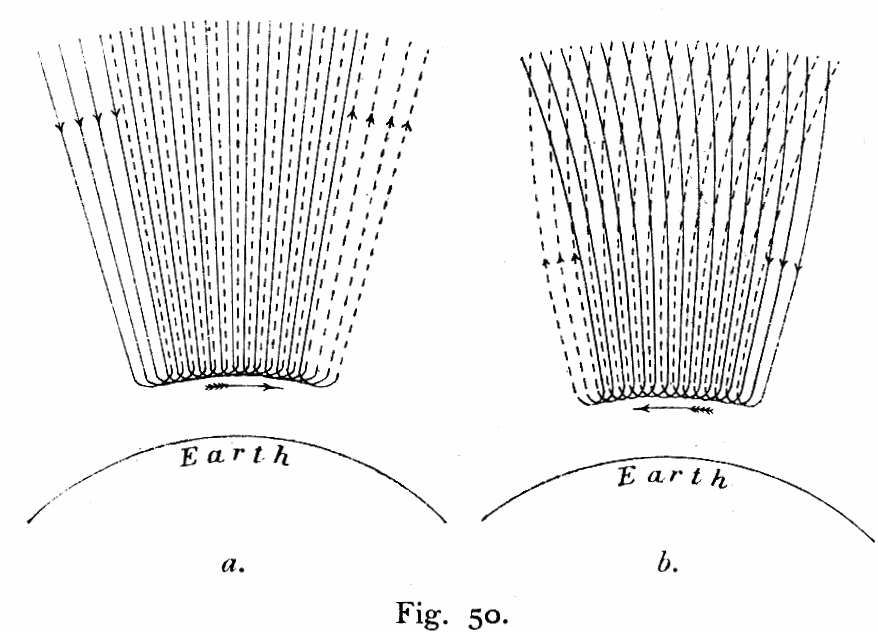
Kristian Birkeland predicted the auroral electrojets in 1908. He wrote p. 95 "the currents there are imagined as having come into existence mainly as a secondary effect of the electric corpuscles from the sun drawn in out of space, and thus far come under the second of the possibilities mentioned above". And p. 105, "Fig. 50a represents those in which the current-directions at the storm-centre are directed westwards, and 50b those in which the currents move eastwards".

After Kristian Birkeland first suggested in 1908 that "currents there [in the aurora] are imagined as having come into existence mainly as a secondary effect of the electric corpuscles from the sun drawn in out of space," the story appears to have become mired in politics. Birkeland's ideas were generally ignored in favor of an alternative theory from British mathematician Sydney Chapman.

In 1939, the Swedish Engineer and plasma physicist Hannes Alfvén promoted Birkeland's ideas in a paper published on the generation of the current from the Solar Wind. In 1964 one of Alfvén's colleagues, Rolf Boström, also used field-aligned currents in a new model of auroral electrojets.

Proof of Birkeland's theory of the aurora only came after a probe was sent into space. The crucial results were obtained from U.S. Navy satellite 1963-38C, launched in 1963 and carrying a magnetometer above the ionosphere. In 1966 Alfred Zmuda, J.H. Martin, and F.T.Heuring analysed the satellite magnetometer results and reported their findings of magnetic disturbance in the aurora. In 1967 Alex Dessler and graduate student David Cummings wrote an article arguing that Zmuda et al. had detected field-aligned currents. Alfvén subsequently acknowledged that Dessler had "discovered the currents that Birkeland had predicted" and they should be called Birkeland-Dessler currents. 1967 is therefore taken as the date when Birkeland's theory was finally acknowledged to have been vindicated. In 1969 Milo Schield, Alex Dessler and John Freeman used the name "Birkeland currents" for the first time. In 1970 Zmuda, Armstrong and Heuring wrote another paper agreeing that their observations were compatible with field-aligned currents as suggested by Cummings and Dessler and by Boström.

== See also ==
- Electromagnetism
- Magnetohydrodynamics
- Geomagnetic jerk (Secular geomagnetic variation impulse)
- Telluric currents induced ground currents or ground portion of Birkeland current
- Plasma cosmology claims that Birkeland currents happen at galactic level and are important in the formation of galaxies
