= Electrojet =

Electric current around the E region of ionosphere

An electrojet is an electric current which travels around the E region of the Earth's ionosphere. There are three electrojets: one above the magnetic equator (the equatorial electrojet), and one each near the Northern and Southern Polar Circles (the Auroral Electrojets). Electrojets are Hall currents carried primarily by electrons at altitudes from 100 to 150 km. In this region the electron gyro frequency (Larmor frequency) is much greater than the electron-neutral collision frequency. In contrast, the principal E region ions (O_{2}^{+} and NO^{+}) have gyrofrequencies much lower than the ion-neutral collision frequency.

Kristian Birkeland was the first to suggest that polar electric currents (or auroral electrojets) are connected to a system of filaments (now called "Birkeland currents") that flow along geomagnetic field lines into and away from the polar region.

== Equatorial Electrojet ==
The worldwide solar-driven wind results in the so-called Sq (solar quiet) current system in the E region of the Earth's ionosphere (100–130 km altitude). Resulting from this current is an electrostatic field directed E-W (dawn-dusk) in the equatorial day side of the ionosphere. At the magnetic dip equator, where the geomagnetic field is horizontal, this electric field results in an enhanced eastward current within ± 3 degrees of the magnetic equator, known as the equatorial electrojet.

== Auroral Electrojet ==
The term 'auroral electrojet' is the name given to the large horizontal currents that flow in the D and E regions of the auroral ionosphere. Although horizontal ionospheric currents can be expected to flow at any latitude where horizontal ionospheric electric fields are present, the auroral electrojet currents are remarkable for their strength and persistence. There are two main factors in the production of the electrojet. First of all, the conductivity of the auroral ionosphere is generally larger than that at lower latitudes. Secondly, the horizontal electric field in the auroral ionosphere is also larger than that at lower latitudes. Since the strength of the current is directly proportional to the vector product of the conductivity and the horizontal electric field, the auroral electrojet currents are generally larger than those at lower latitudes.

During magnetically quiet periods, the electrojet is generally confined to the auroral oval. However, during disturbed periods, the electrojet increases in strength and expands to both higher and lower latitudes. This expansion results from two factors, enhanced particle precipitation and enhanced ionospheric electric fields.

The Auroral Electrojet Index measures magnetic activity as observed by a chain of high-latitude observatories.

== See also ==
- Magnetohydrodynamics
- Kennelly–Heaviside layer
- Ionosphere
