= Kristian Birkeland =

Norwegian scientist (1867–1917)

Kristian Olaf Bernhard Birkeland
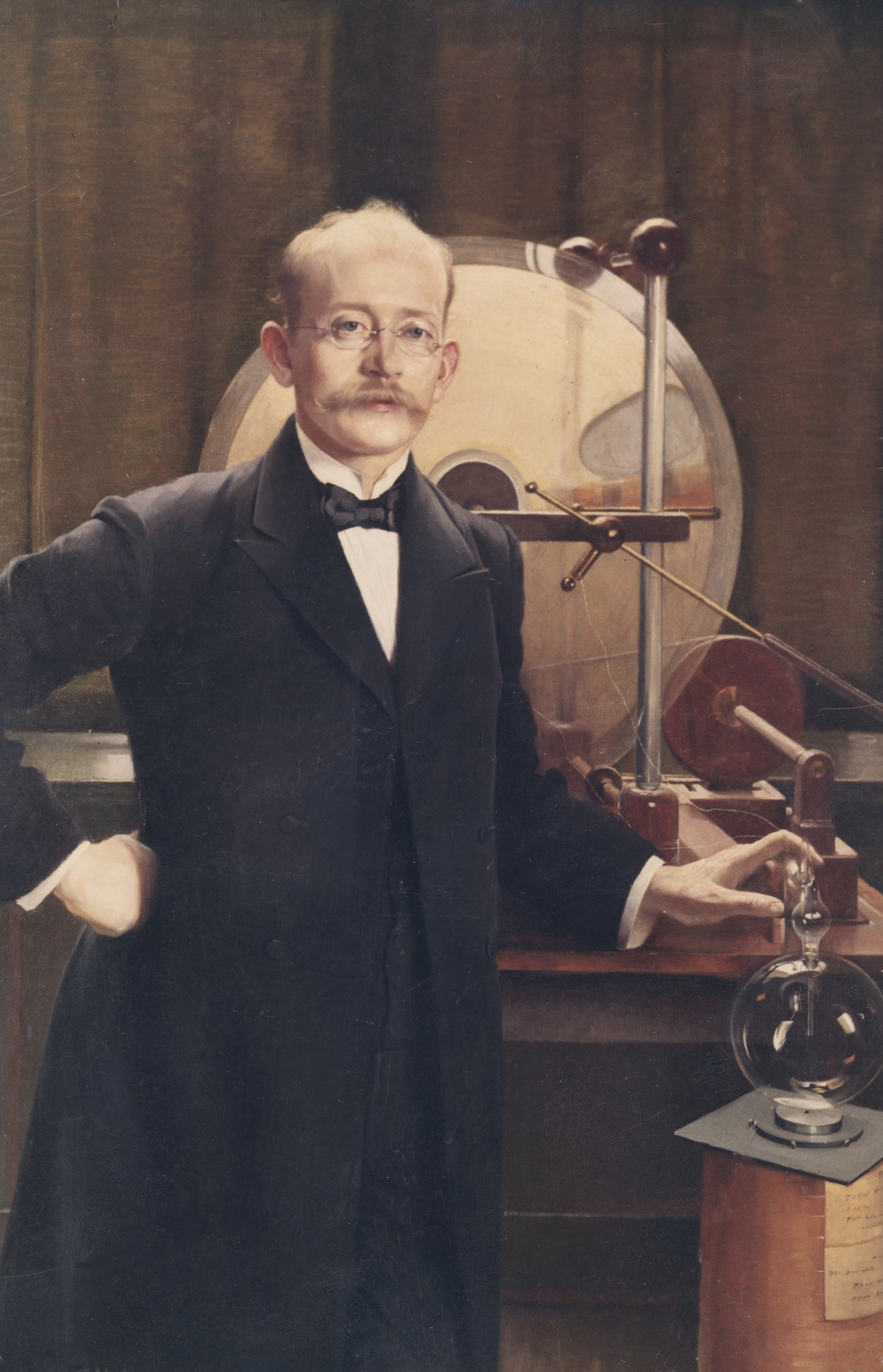
- Portrait by Asta Nørregaard, 1900
- Born: 13 December 1867; Christiania, Norway
- Died: 15 June 1917 (aged 49); Tokyo, Japan
- Known for: Birkeland current Birkeland–Eyde process Research on Aurora borealis Coilgun; Solar wind Substorm
- Spouse: Ida Charlotte Hammer
- Scientific career
- Fields: Physics
- Institutions: The Royal Frederick University

Kristian Olaf Bernhard Birkeland (born 13 December 1867 – 15 June 1917) was a Norwegian space physicist, inventor, and professor of physics at the Royal Fredriks University in Oslo. He is best remembered for his theories of atmospheric electric currents that elucidated the nature of the aurora borealis. In order to fund his research on the aurorae, he invented the electromagnetic cannon and the Birkeland–Eyde process of fixing nitrogen from the air. Birkeland was nominated for the Nobel Prize seven times.

== Life and death ==
Birkeland was born in Christiania (today Oslo) to Reinart and Ingeborg Birkeland (née Ege) and wrote his first scientific paper at the age of 18. Birkeland married Ida Charlotte Hammer in May 1905. They had no children and, due to Birkeland's preoccupation with his work, they divorced in 1911.

Suffering from severe paranoia due to his use of barbital as a sleeping aid, he died under mysterious circumstances in his room in the Hotel Seiyoken in Tokyo while visiting colleagues at the University of Tokyo. A post-mortem revealed that Birkeland had taken 10 g of barbital the night he died, instead of the 0.5 g recommended. The time of death was estimated at 3am on 15 June 1917. Some authors have claimed that he committed suicide. "On the nightstand lay a revolver".

== Research ==
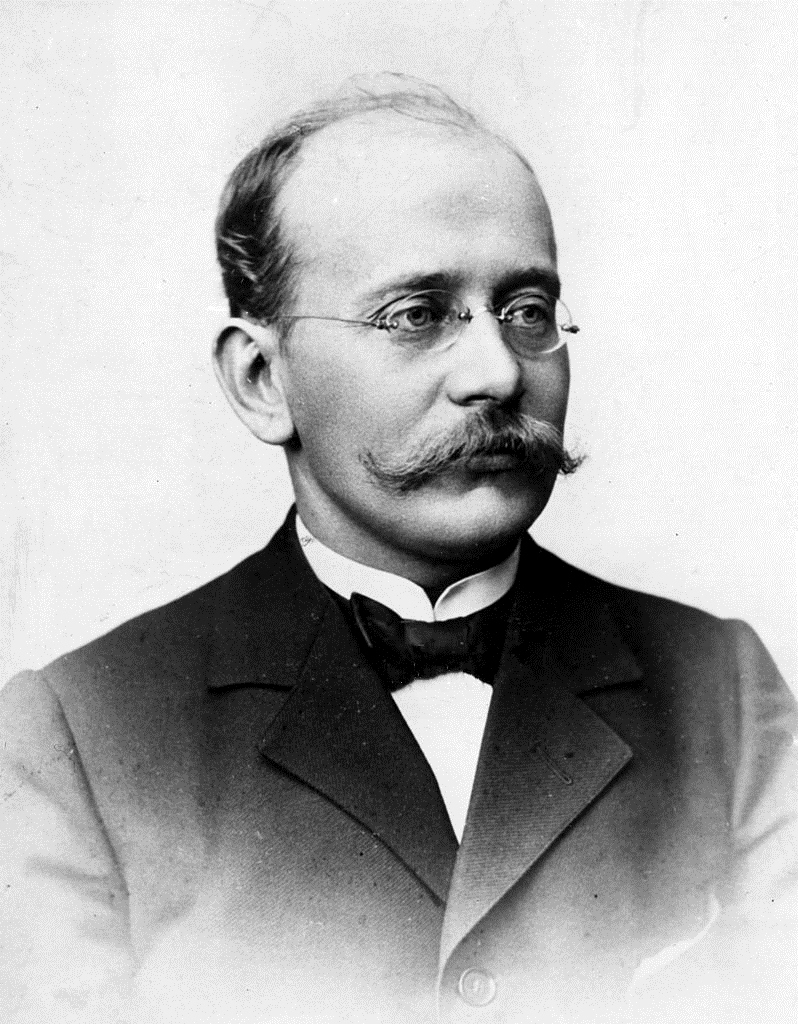
Kristian Birkeland

Birkeland organized several expeditions to Norway's high-latitude regions where he established a network of observatories under the auroral regions to collect magnetic field data. The results of the Norwegian Polar Expedition conducted from 1899 to 1900 contained the first determination of the global pattern of electric currents in the polar region from ground magnetic field measurements.

The discovery of X-rays inspired Birkeland to develop vacuum chambers to study the influence of magnets on cathode rays. Birkeland noticed that an electron beam directed toward a terrella, a model of the Earth consisting of a spherical magnet, was guided toward the magnetic poles and produced rings of light around the poles and concluded that the aurora could be produced in a similar way. He developed a theory in which energetic electrons were ejected from sunspots on the solar surface, directed to the Earth, and guided to the Earth's polar regions by the geomagnetic field where they produced the visible aurora. This is essentially the theory of the aurora today.

Birkeland proposed in 1908 in his book The Norwegian Aurora Polaris Expedition 1902–1903 that polar electric currents, today referred to as auroral electrojets, were connected to a system of currents that flowed along geomagnetic field lines into and away from the polar region. Such field-aligned currents are known today as Birkeland currents in his honour. He provided a diagram of field-aligned currents in the book, and this diagram was reproduced on the back of the Norwegian 200 kroner 7th series banknote in the lower right corner, and his terrella experiment is shown on the front at the left with a portrait of Birkeland on the right. The book on the 1902–1903 expedition contains chapters on magnetic storms on the Earth and their relationship to the Sun, the origin of the Sun itself, Halley's Comet, and the rings of Saturn.

Birkeland's vision of what are now known as Birkeland currents became the source of a controversy that continued for over half a century, because their existence could not be confirmed from ground-based measurements alone. His theory was disputed and ridiculed at the time as a fringe theory by mainstream scientists, most notoriously by the eminent British geophysicist and mathematician Sydney Chapman who argued the mainstream view that currents could not cross the vacuum of space and therefore the currents had to be generated by the Earth. Birkeland's theory of the aurora continued to be dismissed by mainstream astrophysicists after his death in 1917. It was notably championed by the Swedish plasma scientist Hannes Alfvén, but Alfvén's work in turn was also disputed by Chapman.

Proof of Birkeland's theory of the aurora only came in 1967 after a probe was sent into space. The crucial results were obtained from U.S. Navy satellite 1963-38C, launched in 1963 and carrying a magnetometer above the ionosphere. Magnetic disturbances were observed on nearly every pass over the high-latitude regions of the Earth. These were originally interpreted as hydromagnetic waves, but on later analysis it was realized that they were due to field-aligned or Birkeland currents.

The scale of Birkeland's research enterprises was such that funding became an overwhelming obstacle. Recognizing that technological invention could bring wealth, he developed an electromagnetic cannon and, with some investors, formed a firearms company. The coil-gun worked, except the high muzzle velocities he predicted (600 m/s) were not produced. The most he could get from his largest machine was 100 m/s, corresponding to a disappointing projectile range of only 1 km. So he renamed the device an aerial torpedo and arranged a demonstration with the express aim of selling the company. At the demonstration, one of the coils shorted and produced a sensational inductive arc complete with noise, flame, and smoke. This was the first failure of any of the launchers that Birkeland had built. It could easily have been repaired and another demonstration organized.

However, fate intervened in the form of an engineer named Sam Eyde. At a dinner party only one week later, Eyde told Birkeland that there was an industrial need for the biggest flash of lightning that can be brought down to Earth in order to make artificial fertilizer. Birkeland's reply was, "I have it!" There were no more attempts to sell the firearms company, and he worked with Eyde only long enough to build a plasma arc device for the nitrogen fixation process. The pair worked to develop the prototype furnace into a design that was economically viable for large-scale manufacture. The resulting company, Norsk Hydro, hugely enriched Norway, and Birkeland then enjoyed adequate funding for research, his only real interest.

The Birkeland–Eyde process is relatively inefficient in terms of energy consumption. Therefore, in the 1910s and 1920s, it was gradually replaced in Norway by a combination of the Haber process and the Ostwald process.

In 1913, Birkeland may have been the first to predict that plasma was ubiquitous in space. He wrote: "It seems to be a natural consequence of our points of view to assume that the whole of space is filled with electrons and flying electric ions of all kinds. We have assumed that each stellar system in evolutions throws off electric corpuscles into space. It does not seem unreasonable therefore to think that the greater part of the material masses in the universe is found, not in the solar systems or nebulae, but in 'empty' space."

In 1916, Birkeland was probably the first person to successfully predict that the solar wind behaves as do all charged particles in an electric field: "From a physical point of view it is most probable that solar rays are neither exclusively negative nor positive rays, but of both kinds". In other words, the solar wind consists of both negative electrons and positive ions.

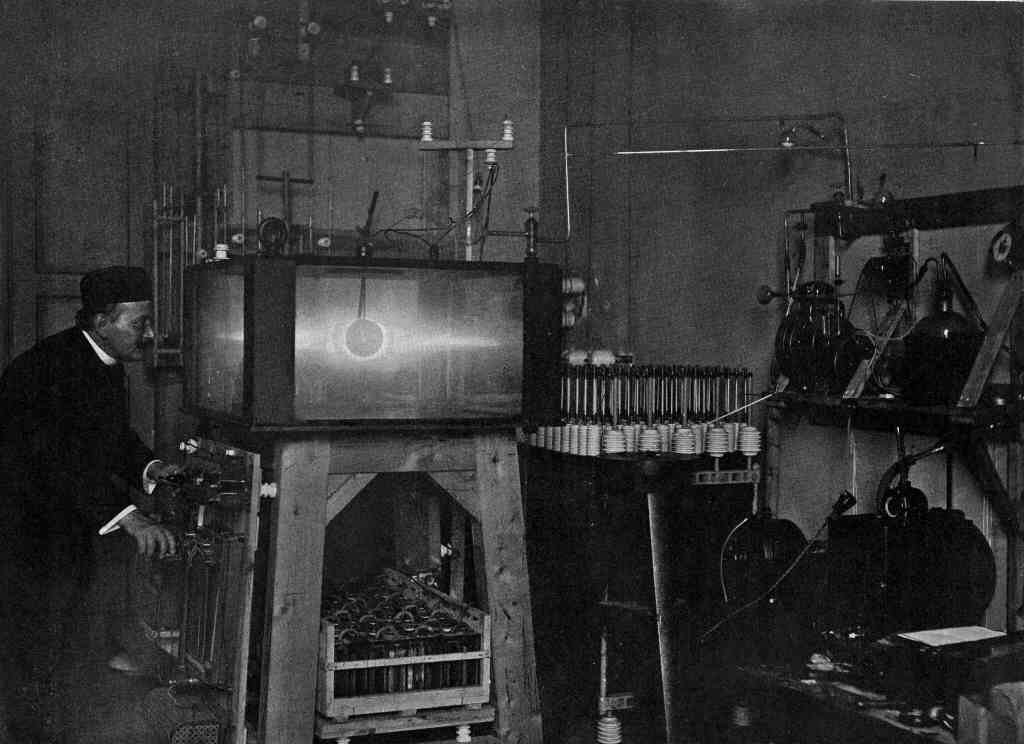
Kristian Birkeland and his terrella experiment

The first complete map of the statistical location of Birkeland currents in the Earth's polar region was developed in 1974 by A.J. Zmuda and J.C. Armstrong and refined in 1976 by T. Iijima and T.A. Potemra

As a scholar with wide interests, Birkeland joined the control commission of NSFPS (Norwegian Society For Psychic Research). The 299 members of the society included, by 1922, people like prime minister Gunnar Knudsen, as well as a wide range of doctors, professors and shipowners. The society arranged circles experimenting with dancing tables and automatic writing, but attracted more attention arranging controlled experiments with invited foreign mediums. In 1912 it was the alleged medium Etta Wriedt from Detroit, famous for her "spirit trumpet", who was exposed as a fraud. Mrs Wriedt's "trumpet" should have been speaking with the "spirit voice" of, among others, Hypatia, but in Norway the "trumpet blows" were exposed as explosions produced by potassium and water. Professor Birkeland exclaimed on that occasion, "I'm supposedly against all witch burnings, but a teeny weeny one in honour of Mrs Wriedt would not have been in the way."

== Legacy ==
Birkeland's theory of the aurora was eventually confirmed and accepted as correct.

An example of one of his experiments is depicted on the left front of a previous version (issued in 1994) of the Norwegian 200 kroner note; it shows a magnetized terrella, simulating the Earth, suspended in an evacuated chamber. Birkeland's face appears a second time in a watermark in the blank space above the drawing of the terrella, and his rudimentary magnetosphere appears on the back, but is only visible under ultraviolet light. The ring encircling the magnetic pole depicted on the back of the bank note is similar to the patterns predicted by Birkeland and shown more recently by satellites. His drawing of what became known as Birkeland currents from his book, The Norwegian Aurora Polaris Expedition 1902–1903, is shown on the back of the banknote at the right.

In 2017, Yara International ordered the Yara Birkeland, which will be the world's first autonomous ship and is named after Birkeland. It will enter service in 2018 and be fully autonomous by 2020.

== Quotes ==
It seems to be a natural consequence of our points of view to assume that the whole of space is filled with electrons and flying electric ions of all kinds. — Kristian Birkeland 1913

A very few lonely pioneers make their way to high places never before visited . . . they create the living conditions of mankind and the majority are living on their work. — Kristian Birkeland
