= Takuo Kojima =

Japanese astronomer

Minor planets discovered: 45
see § List of discovered minor planets

Takuo Kojima (小島 卓雄, Kojima Takuo, born 1955) is a Japanese amateur astronomer and discoverer of minor planets.

He is credited by the Minor Planet Center with the discovery of 45 asteroids he made between 1987 and 2000. Takuo Kojima also writes a regular column for the astronomy magazine Gekkan Temmon titled the "Comet Observers Guide. The main-belt asteroid 3644 Kojitaku is named after him.

== List of discovered minor planets ==
3774 Megumi	December 20, 1987
3786 Yamada	January 10, 1988
3829 Gunma	March 10, 1988
3995 Sakaino	December 5, 1988
3998 Tezuka	January 1, 1989
3999 Aristarchus	January 5, 1989
4041 Miyamotoyohko	February 19, 1988
4156 Okadanoboru	January 16, 1988
4288 Tokyotech	October 8, 1989
4493 Naitomitsu	October 14, 1988
4576 Yanotoyohiko	February 10, 1988
4632 Udagawa	December 17, 1987
4866 Badillo	November 10, 1988
4949 Akasofu	November 29, 1988
5348 Kennoguchi	January 16, 1988
5432 Imakiire	November 3, 1988
5433 Kairen	November 10, 1988
5813 Eizaburo	November 3, 1988
6185 Mitsuma	December 20, 1987
6298 Sawaoka	December 1, 1988
(6551) 1988 XP	December 5, 1988
(6555) 1989 UU_{1}	October 29, 1989
(6706) 1988 VD_{3}	November 11, 1988
(7402) 1987 YH	December 25, 1987
7517 Alisondoane	January 3, 1989

(7563) 1988 BC	January 16, 1988
(7697) 1989 AE	January 3, 1989
(8219) 1996 JL^{[1]}	May 10, 1996
9321 Alexkonopliv	January 5, 1989
(9939) 1988 VK	November 3, 1988
10064 Hirosetamotsu	October 31, 1988
10744 Tsuruta	December 5, 1988
10853 Aimoto	February 6, 1995
11861 Teruhime	November 10, 1988
(12037) 1997 CT_{19}	February 11, 1997
(13023) 1988 XT_{1}	December 10, 1988
(15832) 1995 CB_{1}	February 7, 1995
(23570) 1995 AA	January 1, 1995
(23572) 1995 AS_{2}	January 10, 1995
(43088) 1999 WO_{9}	November 30, 1999
(45263) 2000 AD_{5}	January 3, 2000
(48421) 1988 VF	November 3, 1988
(71236) 2000 AC_{5}	January 3, 2000
(168551) 1999 WH_{4}	November 28, 1999
(192864) 1999 WP_{9}	November 30, 1999
1. ^{1} with Robert H. McNaught
