= Equatorial electrojet =

Narrow ribbon of current flowing eastward

A snapshot of the variation of the Earth's magnetic field from its intrinsic field at 400 km (250 mi) altitude, due to the ionospheric current systems. The equatorial intensification of the magnetic field is due to the equatorial electrojet (EEJ). The EEJ peaks over the Indian Ocean at the point in time depicted. The map was generated using a geomagnetic field model.

The equatorial electrojet (EEJ) is a narrow ribbon of current flowing eastward in the daytime equatorial region of the Earth's ionosphere, and one of three global electrojets. The abnormally large amplitude of variations in the horizontal components measured at equatorial geomagnetic observatories, as a result of EEJ, was noticed as early as 1920 from Huancayo geomagnetic observatory. Observations by radar, rockets, satellites, and geomagnetic observatories are used to study EEJ.

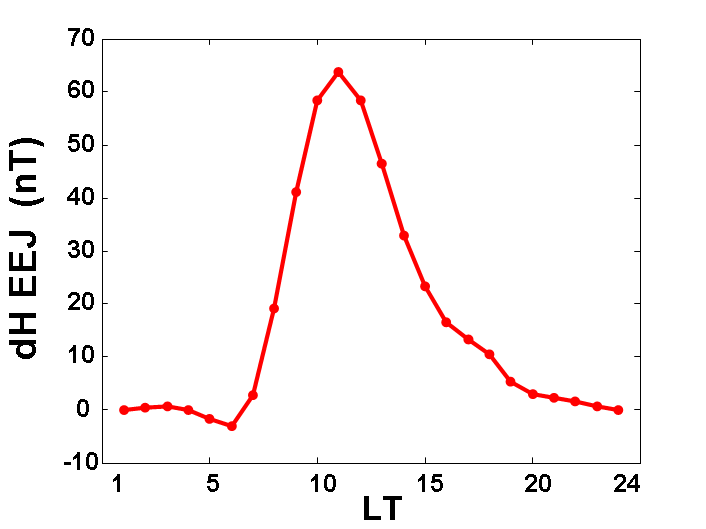
EEJ magnetic signals measured by Ettaiyapuram Magnetic Observatory, India. These data are averages of the daily difference between magnetic data (H) at Ettaiyapuram and Hyderabad collected over several years. The horizontal intensity of magnetic field peaks at ~12 LT. The buildup flank in the morning hours is steeper than that of the decay phase.

Movie of the variation of the geomagnetic field at the surface of the Earth due to the ionospheric current systems. The equatorial intensification of the magnetic field is due to the EEJ. The movie was generated using a geomagnetic field model (CM4). UT = Universal Time; nT = nanotesla.

== Causes ==
The explanation for the existence of the equatorial electrojet lies with the anisotropic nature of ionospheric electrical conductivity and a process of self-reinforcement. Global-scale ionospheric circulation establishes an Sq (solar quiet) current system in the E region of the Earth's ionosphere (100–130 km (62–81 mi) altitude), and a primary eastwards electric field near the day-side magnetic equator, where the magnetic field is horizontal and northwards. This electric field gives a primary eastwards Pedersen current. E cross B drift results in a downwards Hall current, sustaining vertical charge separation across the depth of the ionosphere, giving an upward secondary electric field and a secondary Pedersen current that is opposite to the primary Hall current. A secondary Hall current then reinforces the original Pedersen current. At about 110 km (68 mi) height, the integration of the current density gives a peak current strength of about 100 kA, which supports a day-side electrojet magnetic-field enhancement of a factor of two or so.

== Lunar tide ==
As the position of the Sun, Moon, and Earth changes, so does the strength of the lunar tidal forces. Two spring tides occur each lunar month when the sun, moon, and earth are aligned to produce a strong lunar tidal force. Likewise, two neap tides occur when the sun and moon are adjacent to one another to produce weak lunar tidal forces. The equatorial electrojet (EEJ) has an abnormally large amplitude of variations in the horizontal components due to the strength of the lunar tides. The lunar tide varies as described above and is changed by the gravitational attraction between the Moon and Earth. Because of this, the pressure and temperature of the lower atmosphere vary, and the effects propagate upward in a tidal waveform to the E region and modulate the electrodynamics.

== Studies of the EEJ from satellite and ground magnetic data ==
The EEJ phenomenon was first identified using geomagnetic data. The amplitude of the daily variation of the horizontal magnetic intensity (ΔH) measured at a geomagnetic observatory near the dip-equator is 3–5 fold higher than the variation of data from other regions of Earth. Typical diurnal equatorial observatory data show a peak of strength ~80 nT at 12:00 LT, with respect to the night-time level. Egedal (1947) showed that the enhancement of quiet day solar daily variations in ΔH (Sq(H)) lay within the 50-degree latitude centered on the dip equator. The mechanism that produced the variation in the magnetic field was proposed as a band of current about 300 km (190 mi) in width flowing over the dip equator.

EEJ studies from satellite data were initiated with the arrival of data from the POGO (Polar Orbiting Geophysical Observatory) series of satellites (1965–1970). The characteristic signature of the EEJ is a sharp negative V-shaped curve in the $\Delta$H field, attaining its minimum within 0.5° of the magnetic dip equator. The magnetic data from satellite missions like Ørsted (1999–present) and CHAMP (2000–present) have vastly improved knowledge of the EEJ.

Recent studies have focused on the lunar-solar interaction of the EEJ. It was demonstrated that complexity is introduced into the EEJ due to the interaction between lunar tide variability in the equatorial electric field and solar-driven variability in the E-region conductivity.
