= Birkeland–Eyde process =

Nitrogen fixation process using electrical arcs

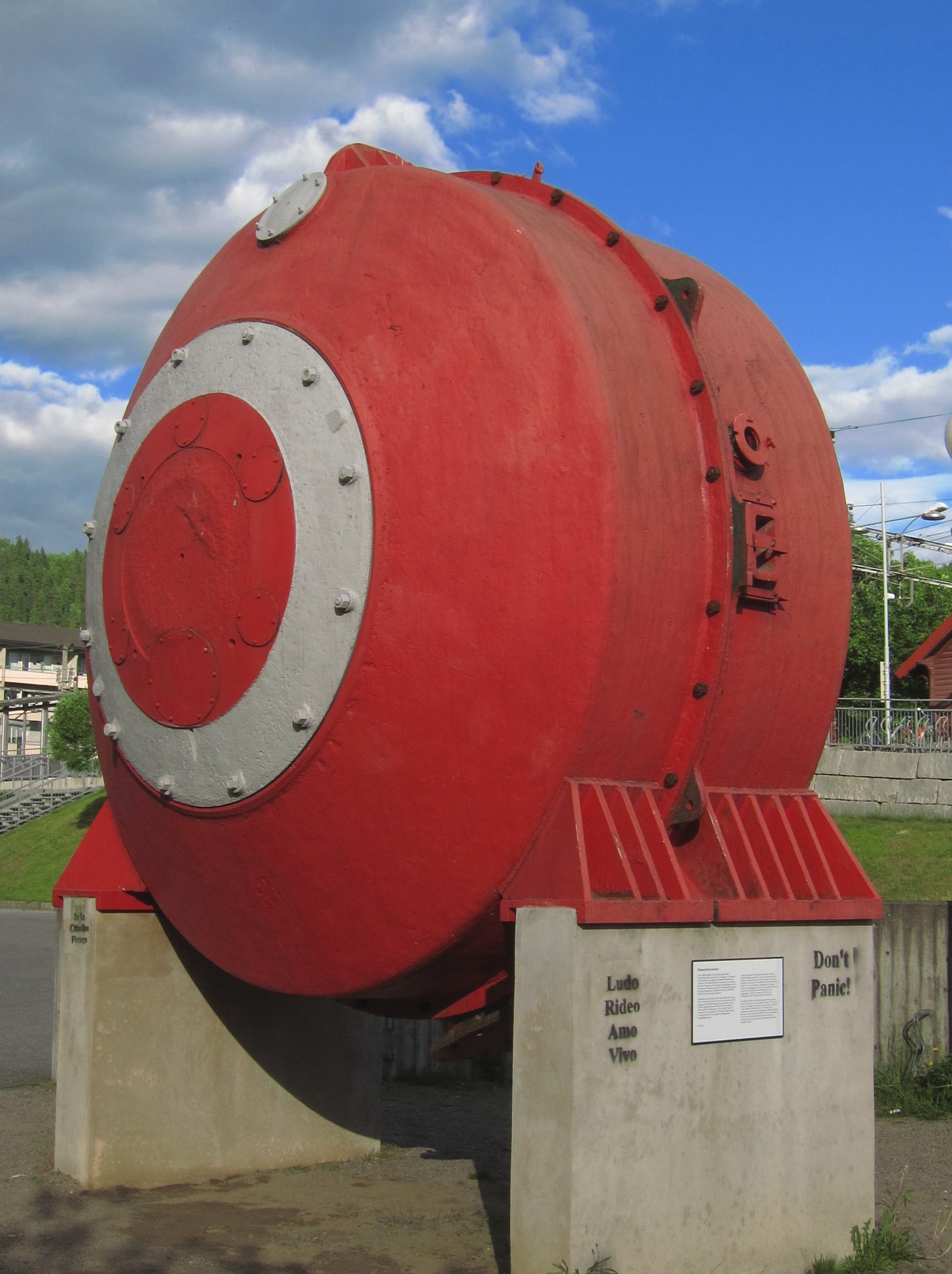
Reactor used in Rjukan from 1916 to 1940 having a capacity of 3000 kW (outside Norwegian Museum of Science and Technology)

The Birkeland–Eyde process was one of the competing industrial processes in the beginning of nitrogen-based fertilizer production. It is a multi-step nitrogen fixation reaction that uses electrical arcs to react atmospheric nitrogen (N_{2}) with oxygen (O_{2}), ultimately producing nitric acid (HNO_{3}) with water. The resultant nitric acid was then used as a source of nitrate (NO_{3}^{−}) in the reaction HNO_{3} + H_{2}O → H_{3}O^{+} + NO_{3}^{−} which may take place in the presence of water or another proton acceptor.

== History ==
The process was developed by Norwegian industrialist and scientist Kristian Birkeland along with his business partner Sam Eyde in 1903, based on a method used by Henry Cavendish in 1784. A factory based on the process was built in Rjukan and Notodden in Norway, combined with the building of large hydroelectric power facilities.

== Method ==
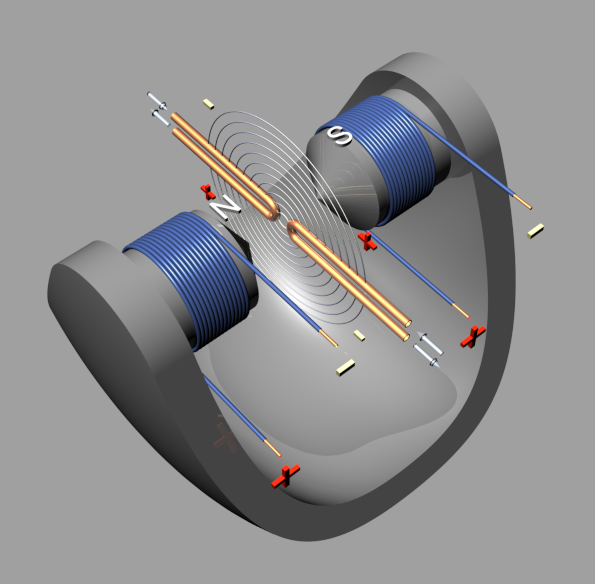
Diagram of the production of a plasma disc using water-cooled electrodes and an electromagnet

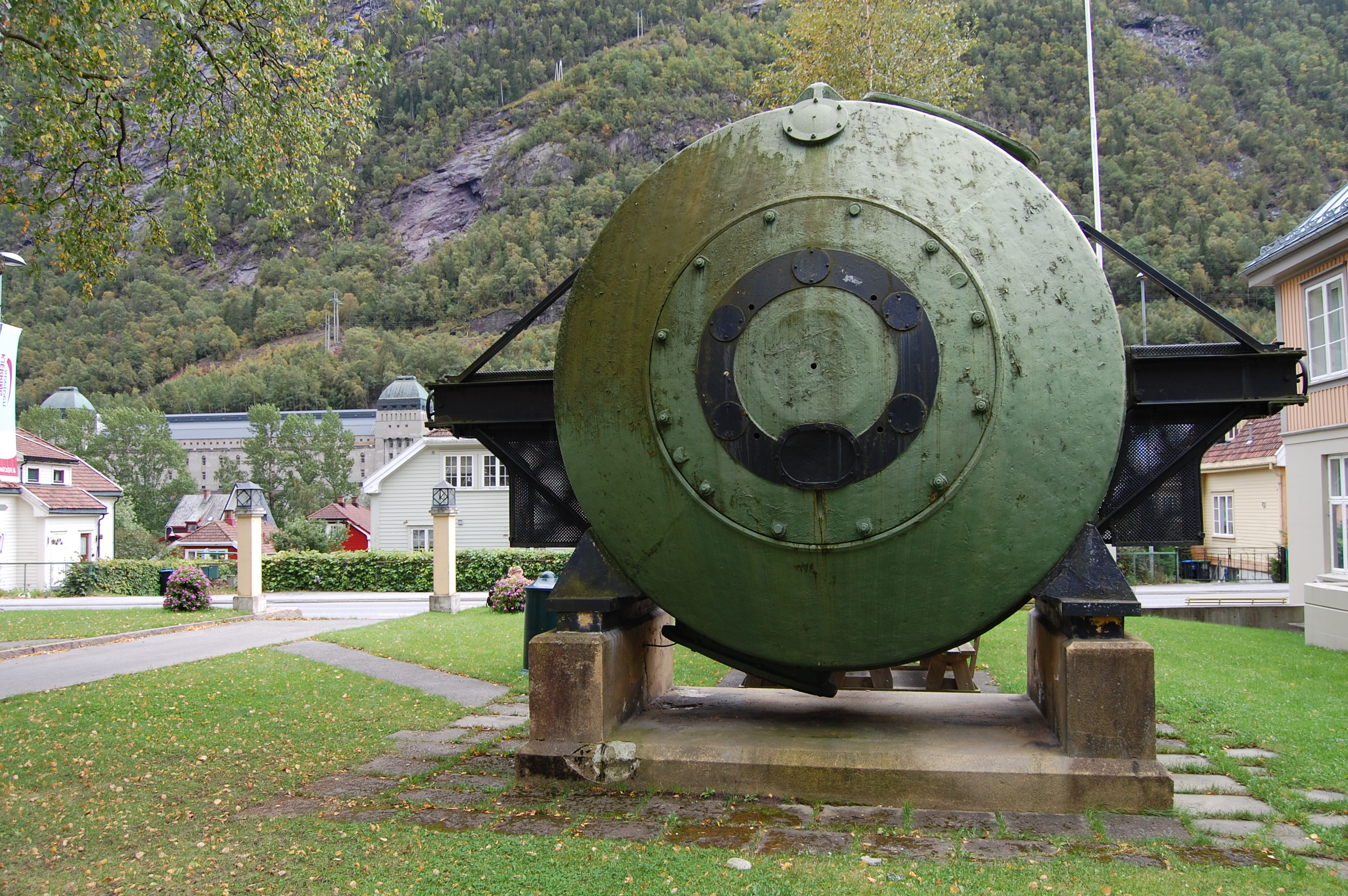
One type of reactor used at Rjukan from 1912 to 1940 now located in a park in Rjukan

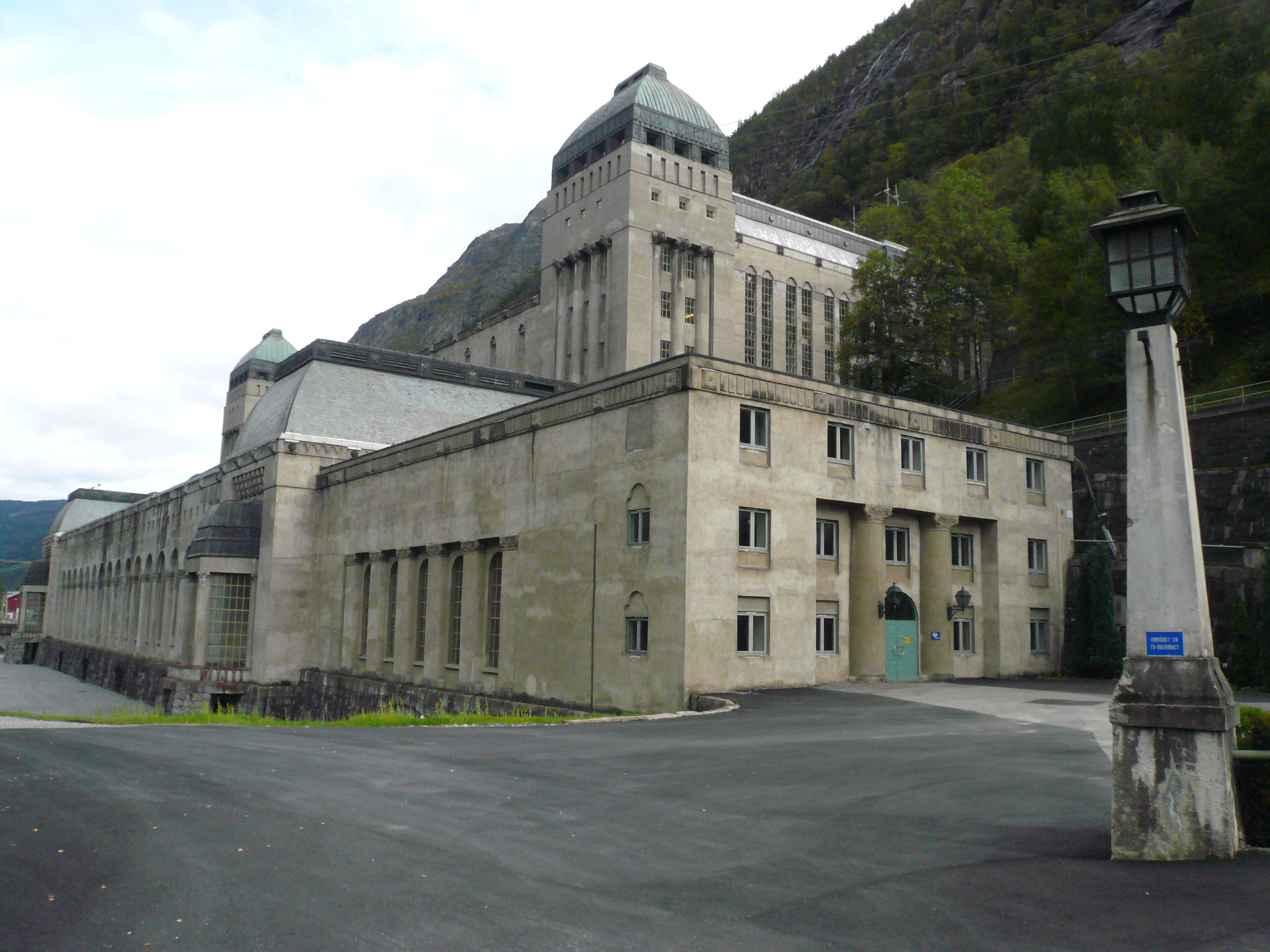
Reactor Building II behind the Såheim Hydroelectric Power Station in which 35 Birkeland-Eyde reactors were installed requiring 3000 kW each

An electrical arc was formed between two coaxial water-cooled copper tube electrodes powered by a high voltage alternating current of 5 kV at 50 Hz. A strong static magnetic field generated by a nearby electromagnet spreads the arc into a thin disc by the Lorentz force. This setup is based on an experiment by Julius Plücker who in 1861 showed how to create a disc of sparks by placing the ends of a U-shaped electromagnet around a spark gap so that the gap between them was perpendicular to the gap between the electrodes, and which was later replicated similarly by Walther Nernst and others. The plasma temperature in the disc was in excess of 3000 °C. Air was blown through this arc, causing some of the nitrogen to react with oxygen forming nitric oxide. By carefully controlling the energy of the arc and the velocity of the air stream, yields of up to approximately 4–5% nitric oxide were obtained at 3000 °C and less at lower temperatures. The process is extremely energy intensive. Birkeland used a nearby hydroelectric power station for the electricity as this process demanded about 15 MWh per ton of nitric acid, yielding approximately 60 g per kWh. The same reaction is carried out by lightning, providing a natural source for converting atmospheric nitrogen to soluble nitrates.

$$\ce{N2 + O2 -> 2NO}$$

The hot nitric oxide is cooled and combines with atmospheric oxygen to produce nitrogen dioxide. The time this process takes depends on the concentration of NO in the air. At 1% it takes about 180 seconds and at 6% about 40 seconds to achieve 90% conversion.

$$\ce{2 NO + O2 -> 2 NO2}$$

This nitrogen dioxide is then dissolved in water to give rise to nitric acid, which is then purified and concentrated by fractional distillation.

$$\ce{3 NO2 + H2O -> 2 HNO3 + NO}$$

The design of the absorption process was critical to the efficiency of the whole system. The nitrogen dioxide was absorbed into water in a series of packed column or plate column absorption towers each four stories tall to produce approximately 40–50% nitric acid. The first towers bubbled the nitrogen dioxide through water and non-reactive quartz fragments. Once the first tower reached final concentration, the nitric acid was moved to a granite storage container, and liquid from the next water tower replaced it. That movement process continued to the last water tower which was replenished with fresh water. About 20% of the produced oxides of nitrogen remained unreacted so the final towers contained an alkaline solution of lime to convert the remaining oxides to calcium nitrate (also known as Norwegian saltpeter) except approximately 2% which were released into the air.

== Efficiency and alternatives ==
The Birkeland–Eyde process is relatively inefficient in terms of energy consumption. Therefore, in the 1910s and 1920s, it was gradually replaced in Norway by a combination of the Haber process and the Ostwald process. The Haber process produces ammonia (NH_{3}) from molecular nitrogen (N_{2}) and hydrogen (H_{2}), the latter usually but not necessarily produced by steam reforming methane (CH_{4}) gas in current practice. The ammonia from the Haber process is then converted into nitric acid (HNO_{3}) in the Ostwald process.
