= Erling Johnson =

Norwegian engineer and chemist (1893–1967)

Erling Bjarne Johnson (7 June 1893 – 5 November 1967) invented the nitrophosphate process in the years 1927-28. The process is recognised internationally as important in the production of fertiliser, but he is little-known in his native Norway.

Johnson worked as a chemical engineer, graduating from Kristiania Tekniske Skole ("Kristiania School of Technics") in 1913. He continued his amanuensis at the chemical institute of the Norwegian University of Life Sciences from 1913 to 1916, where he was assistant to Professor Sebelien. His work concentrated on questions around fertilisers.

He worked as a research chemist for the North Western Cyanamide Company in Odda from 1915 to 1921, where he also worked on fertilisers. He sat on the State Raw Materials Committee in 1921. He was chemical and technical lead for A/S Monopol paint factory in Florvåg on Askøy Municipality, near Bergen, at the same time as working with Jakobsens Fabrikker A/S in Oslo from 1921 to 1924. He was head chemist at Odda Smelteverk A/S from 1925. Johnson was one of the foremost chemists at Odda Smelteverk. He worked there until 1963, when he retired.

In 1964, Johnson was awarded the Guldberg og Waage-medaljen by the Norwegian Chemical Society.
