= International Arctic Research Center =

Research institution in Alaska, USA

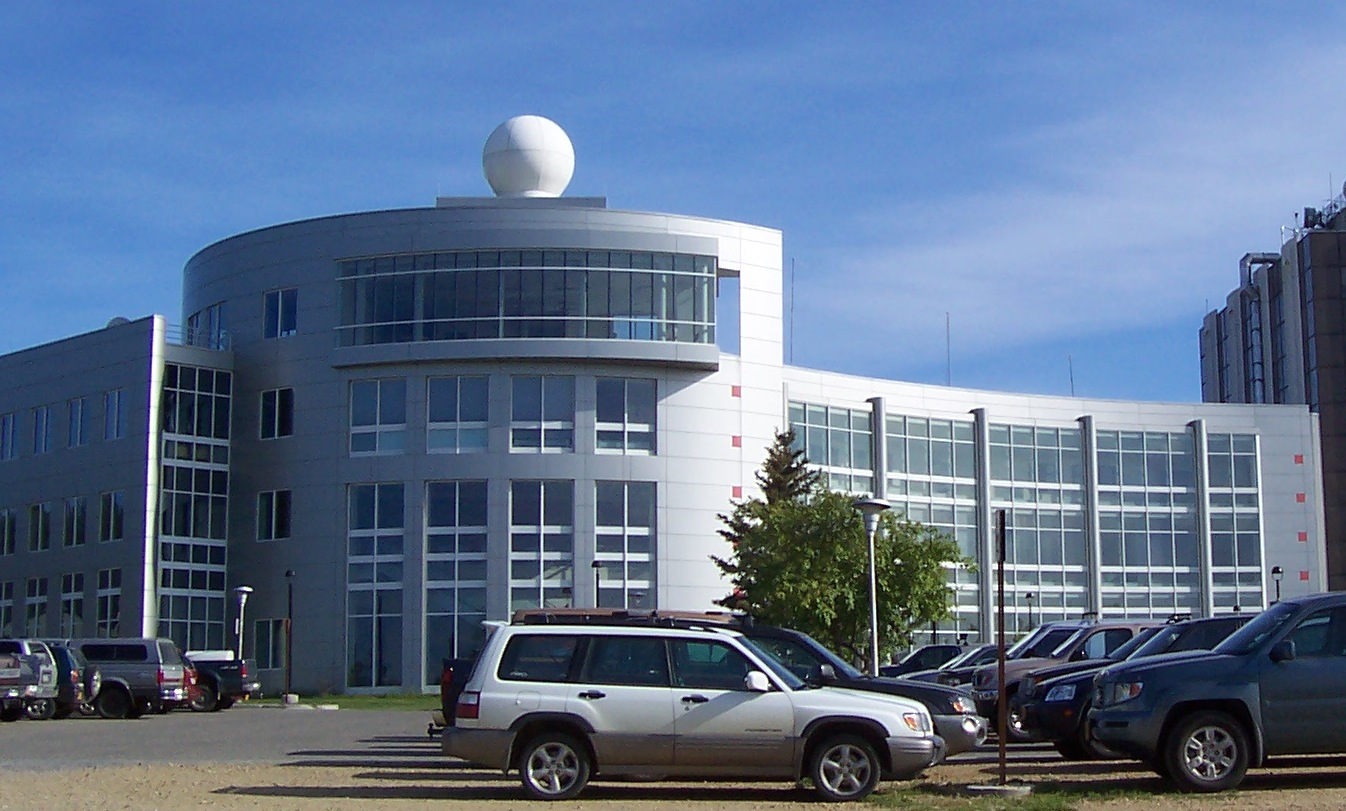
I.A.R.C. in Summer

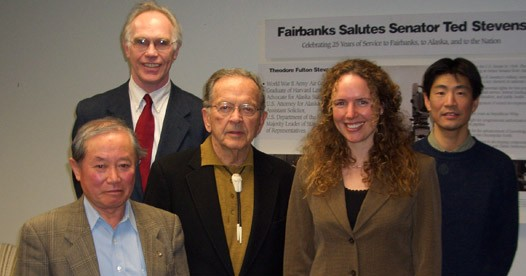
Senator Ted Stevens (center) with researchers from the International Arctic Research Center. Research done by Dr. Katey Walter (second from right) found that melting permafrost will release methane, one of the most potent greenhouse gases.

The International Arctic Research Center, or IARC, established in 1999, is a research institution focused on integrating and coordinating study of Climate change in the Arctic. The primary partners in IARC are Japan and the United States. Participants include organizations from Canada, China, Denmark, Germany, Japan, Norway, Russia, the United Kingdom, and the United States.

== Overview ==
The center is located at the University of Alaska Fairbanks, in the Syun-Ichi Akasofu Building. The Keith B. Mather Library is the science library housed in the Akasofu Building, serving IARC and the Geophysical Institute of UAF. The building also houses the UAF atmospheric sciences department, the Center for Global Change and the Fairbanks forecast office of the National Weather Service.

Study projects are focused within four major themes:

- Arctic ocean models and observation
- Arctic atmosphere: feedbacks, radiation, and weather analysis
- Permafrost/Frozen soil models and observations
- Arctic biota/vegetation (ecosystem models)

IARC is devoting specific effort to answering the following three questions:

1. To what extent is climate change due to natural vs man-made causes?
2. What parameters, processes and interactions are needed to understand and predict future climate change?
3. What are the likely impacts of climate change?
