= Attract-kill pattern =

An attract-kill pattern is essentially a biological interaction between plant roots and pathogens where plants entice pathogens towards their roots, to ultimately neutralize them. This has been seen to have an important role in the suppression of diseases such as Phytophthora in intercropping systems.

An example of this process can be seen in recent research from Key Laboratory of Agro-Biodiversity and Pest Management of Education Ministry of China where they indicated that maize roots attracted the zoospores of Phytophthora capsici and inhibited their motility while also causing cystospores lysis. The phenomenon has been found in various interactions between roots of non-host plant and Phytophthora.

== Mechanism ==
The attract- kill pattern entails plants having to rely on chemical signals or pheromone's to lure pathogens towards their roots. Following the arrival of a given pathogen plants either immobilize or lyse the incoming pathogen to prevent their ability to infect a given host plant. Maize roots for example attract zoospores of Phytophthora capsici and inhibited their motility to prevent the infection of host plant species

=== Pest management ===
Reducing the amount of pesticides used in the environment is the major motivation for uncovering the successfulness of methods such as attract-kill. The attract-kill method is used in pest management and eradication of invasive species. This method combines sex pheromone and a killing agent such as a pathogen or insecticide to lure large numbers of pests to a specific area to ultimately eradicate them. Attractants used to lure and then kill pests are commonly either crude baits or synthetic semiochemicals. This method is highly effective in controlling small, low-density, isolated populations. Thus, it is compelling for long-term pest management.
