= Substorm =

Short term magnetosphere disturbance

A substorm, sometimes referred to as a magnetospheric substorm or an auroral substorm, is a brief disturbance in the Earth's magnetosphere that causes energy to be released from the "tail" of the magnetosphere and injected into the high latitude ionosphere. Visually, a substorm is seen as a sudden brightening and increased movement of auroral arcs. Substorms were first described in qualitative terms by Kristian Birkeland which he called polar elementary storms. Sydney Chapman used the term substorm about 1960 which is now the standard term. The morphology of aurora during a substorm was first described by Syun-Ichi Akasofu in 1964 using data collected during the International Geophysical Year.

Substorms are distinct from geomagnetic storms in that the latter take place over a period of several days, are observable from anywhere on Earth, inject a large number of ions into the outer radiation belt, and occur once or twice a month during the maximum of the solar cycle and a few times a year during solar minimum. Substorms, on the other hand, take place over a period of a few hours, are observable primarily at the polar regions, do not inject many particles into the radiation belt, and are relatively frequent — often occurring only a few hours apart from each other. Substorms can be more intense and occur more frequently during a geomagnetic storm when one substorm may start before the previous one has completed. The source of the magnetic disturbances observed at the Earth's surface during geomagnetic storms is the ring current, whereas the sources of magnetic disturbances observed on the ground during substorms are electric currents in the ionosphere at high latitudes. During a substorm, the currents flowing across the magnetotail divert into the ionosphere through the substorm current wedge, flowing westward.

Substorms can cause magnetic field disturbances in the auroral zones up to a magnitude of 1000 nT, roughly 2% of the total magnetic field strength in that region. The disturbance is much greater in space, as some geosynchronous satellites have registered the magnetic field dropping to half its normal strength during a substorm. The most visible indication of a substorm is an increase in the intensity and size of polar auroras. Substorms can be divided into three phases: the growth phase, the expansion phase, and the recovery phase.

In 2012, the THEMIS satellite mission observed the dynamics of rapidly developing substorms, confirming the existence of giant magnetic ropes and witnessed small explosions in the outskirts of Earth's magnetic field.

Auroral substorm imagery

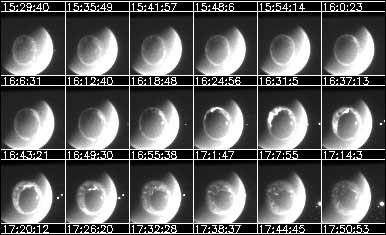
A series of images made by ultraviolet light imager on the Polar spacecraft showing the aurora and Earth's upper atmosphere. The glowing side is the atmosphere lit up by the Sun's light energy and the oval of light is the aurora. During a substorm the auroral oval brightens in a localized area and then suddenly breaks into many different forms that expand both toward Earth's pole and equator. This is exactly what Shun-ichi Akasofu (1964) drew in his auroral substorm illustration.

Short video featuring commentary by David Sibeck, project scientist for the THEMIS mission, discussing a visualization of reconnection fronts.

An auroral substorm captured by the SMILE satellite's ultraviolet imager in 2026. (European Space Agency / Chinese Academy of Sciences)
