= Nitrophosphate process =

Method to produce nitrogen fertilizers

The nitrophosphate process (also known as the Odda process) is a method for the industrial production of nitrogen fertilizers invented by Erling Johnson in Odda Municipality, Norway. around 1927.

The process involves acidifying phosphate rock with dilute nitric acid to produce a mixture of phosphoric acid and calcium nitrate.

$$\ce{Ca5(PO4)3OH + 10 HNO3 -> 3 H3PO4 + 5 Ca(NO3)2 + H2O}$$

The mixture is cooled to below 0 °C, where the calcium nitrate crystallizes and can be separated from the phosphoric acid.

$$\ce{2 H3PO4 + 3 Ca(NO3)2 + 12 H2O -> 2 H3PO4 + 3 Ca(NO3)2.4H2O}$$

The resulting calcium nitrate produces nitrogen fertilizer. The filtrate is composed mainly of phosphoric acid with some nitric acid and traces of calcium nitrate, and this is neutralized with ammonia to produce a compound fertilizer.

$$\ce{Ca(NO3)2 + 4 H3PO4 + 8 NH3 -> CaHPO4 + 2 NH4NO3 + 3(NH4)2HPO4}$$

If potassium chloride or potassium sulfate is added, the result will be NPK fertilizer. The process was an innovation for requiring neither the expensive sulfuric acid nor producing gypsum waste (known in the context of phosphate production as phosphogypsum).

The calcium nitrate mentioned before, can as said be worked up as calcium nitrate fertilizer but often it is converted into ammonium nitrate and calcium carbonate using carbon dioxide and ammonia.

$$\ce{Ca(NO3)2 +  2 NH3 + CO2 + H2O -> 2 NH4NO3 + CaCO3}$$

Both products can be worked up together as straight nitrogen fertilizer.

Although Johnson created the process while working for the Odda Smelteverk, his company never employed it. Instead, it licensed the process to Norsk Hydro, BASF, Hoechst, and DSM. Each of these companies used the process, introduced variations, and licensed it to other companies. Today, only a few companies (e.g. Yara (Norsk Hydro), Acron, EuroChem, Borealis Agrolinz Melamine GmbH, Omnia, GNFC) still use the Odda process. Due to the alterations of the process by the various companies who employed it, the process is now generally referred to as the nitrophosphate process.
