= Syun-Ichi Akasofu =

Geophysicist and climatologist (born 1930)

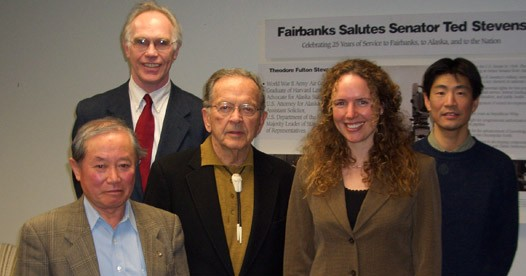
- Akasofu (left), with then-U.S. Senator Ted Stevens (center), Katey Walter (second from right), Larry Hinzman (back left), Tohru Saito (back right) in 2008
- Born: December 4, 1930 (age 95); Saku, Nagano Prefecture, Japan
- Citizenship: American
- Education: Tohoku University, Sendai, Japan (B.A., 1953; M.S., 1957), University of Alaska Fairbanks (Ph.D., 1961)
- Known for: Space physics, Aurora research
- Awards: Chapman Medal of the Royal Astronomical Society, Fellow of the AGU, John Adam Fleming Medal of the AGU, Edith R. Bullock Prize for Excellence of the University of Alaska, and Order of the Sacred Treasures, Gold and Silver Stars by the Emperor of Japan
- Scientific career
- Fields: Geophysics
- Workplaces: University of Alaska Fairbanks
- Thesis: A study of magnetic storms and auroras (1961)
- Doctoral advisor: Sydney Chapman

Syun-Ichi Akasofu (赤祖父 俊一, Akasofu Shun'ichi; born December 4, 1930, Saku, Nagano, Japan) is a Japanese-American geophysicist known for his research on auroras, auroral substorms, and magnetospheric physics.

He is the founding director of the International Arctic Research Center of the University of Alaska Fairbanks (UAF), serving in that position from the center's establishment in 1998 until January 2007. Previously he had been director of the university's Geophysical Institute from 1986.

== Background ==
Akasofu earned a B.S. and a M.S. in geophysics at Tohoku University, Sendai, Japan, in 1953 and 1957, respectively. He earned a Ph.D. in geophysics at UAF in 1961. Within the framework of his Ph.D. thesis he studied the aurora. His scientific adviser was Sydney Chapman. Akasofu has been a professor of geophysics at UAF since 1964.

== Career ==
=== Research and academic career ===
Akasofu's early research examined auroral activity using photographic records collected at observation stations across Alaska, Canada, and Siberia. By comparing observations from different locations, he investigated how auroral forms changed over time and how activity at separate points around the polar region was related.

In 1964, he published “The Development of the Auroral Substorm” in Planetary and Space Science. The paper described auroral substorms as sequences of activity involving expansion and subsequent recovery, providing a framework for examining changes in auroral forms across the polar region. Although the concept initially encountered resistance, later observations from aircraft and satellites supported important aspects of his model. The paper became a frequently cited contribution to space physics.

Akasofu continued to investigate the relationship between auroral activity, geomagnetic disturbances, the solar wind, and Earth's magnetosphere. His subsequent work addressed the energy transferred from the solar wind into the magnetosphere and the physical processes associated with magnetospheric substorms. His publications include Polar and Magnetospheric Substorms (1968), Solar-Terrestrial Physics (1972), co-authored with Chapman, and Physics of Magnetospheric Substorms (1977).

=== Geophysical Institute directorship ===
Akasofu served as director of the Geophysical Institute at the University of Alaska Fairbanks from 1986 to 1999. During his tenure, he supported the modernization of Poker Flat Research Range, the university's sounding-rocket research facility, and played a role in establishing the Alaska Volcano Observatory in 1988.

The Alaska Satellite Facility also developed from satellite remote-sensing initiatives at the university during this period. The facility was established in 1991 through a collaboration involving the University of Alaska, NASA, and the National Oceanic and Atmospheric Administration.

=== International Arctic Research Center ===
Akasofu helped to established the International Arctic Research Center (IARC) at the University of Alaska Fairbanks through cooperation between the United States and Japan. The initiative formed part of the bilateral scientific cooperation advanced by U.S. President Bill Clinton and Japanese Prime Minister Ryutaro Hashimoto in 1997. The center was established in 1998–1999, with Akasofu serving as its founding director until January 2007.

The center was created to promote international research into Arctic environmental processes and change. Akasofu helped secure financial and institutional support for the project, including substantial contributions from Japanese partners toward the center's building. His work in establishing IARC extended his administrative responsibilities from space physics into a broader interdisciplinary research environment concerned with the Arctic.

== Selected publications ==
He is an ISI highly cited researcher.

- Akasofu, S.-I., Polar and Magnetospheric Substorms, D. Reidel Pub. Co., Dordrecht, Holland, 1968, (also a Russian edition).
- Akasofu, S.-I., B. Fogle, and B. Haurwitz, Sydney Chapman, Eighty, published by the National Center for Atmospheric Research and the Publishing Service of the University of Colorado, 1968.
- Akasofu, S.-I. and S. Chapman, Solar-Terrestrial Physics, Clarendon Press, Oxford, England, 1972, (also a Russian and Chinese edition).
- Akasofu, S.-I., The Aurora: A Discharge Phenomenon Surrounding the Earth, (in Japanese), Chuo-koran- sha, Tokyo, Japan.
- Akasofu, S.-I., Physics of Magnetospheric Substorms, D. Reidel, Pub. Co., Dordrecht, Holland, 1977.
- Akasofu, S.-I., Aurora Borealis: The Amazing Northern Lights, Alaska Geographic Society, Alaska Northwest Pub. Co., 6, 2, 1979, (also a Japanese edition).
- Akasofu, S.-I. (ed.), Dynamics of the Magnetosphere, D. Reidel Pub. Co., Dordrecht, Holland, 1979.
- Akasofu, S.-I. and J.R. Kan (eds.), Physics of Auroral Arc Formation, Am. Geophys. Union, Washington, D.C., 1981.
- Akasofu, S.-I. and Y. Kamide (eds.), The Solar Wind and the Earth, Geophys. Astrophys. Monographs, Terra Scientific Pub. Co., Tokyo, Japan, and D. Reidel Pub. Co., Dordrecht, Holland, 1987.
- Akasofu, S.-I., Secrets of the Aurora Borealis, Alaska Geographic Society, Banta Publications Group/Hart Press, Vol. 29, No. 1, 2002.
- Akasofu, S.-I. Exploring the Secrets of the Aurora, Kluwer Academic Publishers, Netherlands, 2002.

== Awards and honors ==
- 1976 - Chapman Medal, Royal Astronomical Society
- 1977 - The Japan Academy of Sciences Award
- 1979 - Fellow of the American Geophysical Union (AGU)
- 1979 - John Adam Fleming Medal, AGU
- 1980 - Named a Distinguished Alumnus by UAF
- 1981 - Named one of the "1,000 Most-Cited Contemporary Scientists by Current Contents
- 1985 - First recipient of the Sydney Chapman Chair professorship, UAF
- 1985 - Special Lecture for the Emperor of Japan on the aurora (October 3)
- 1986 - Member of the International Academy of Aeronautics, Paris
- 1987 - Named one of the "Centennial Alumni" by the National Association of State Universities and Land Grant Colleges
- 1993 - Japan Foreign Minister's Award for Promoting International Relations and Cultural Exchange between Japan and Alaska
- 1996 - Japan Posts and Telecommunications Minister Award for Contributions to the US-Japan Joint Project on Environmental Science in Alaska
- 1997 - Edith R. Bullock Prize for Excellence, University of Alaska
- 1999 - Alaskan of the Year - Denali Award
- 2002 - Named one of the "World's Most Cited Authors in Space Physics" by Current Contents ISI
- 2003 - Order of the Sacred Treasures, Gold and Silver Stars by the Emperor of Japan
- 2011 - European Geosciences Union, Hannes Alfvén Medal
