= Yamaneko Group of Comet Observers =

Japanese astronomical group

The Yamaneko Group of Comet Observers (YGCO) is a famous group of astronomical observers based in Japan. Founded by K. Ichikawa in 1980, the members have obtained approximately 12,300 astronomic and 6,300 photometric observations. This group maintains the YGCO Chiyoda Station, also based in Japan.

== Notable members ==
- Akimasa Nakamura

== See also ==
- List of astronomical societies
