= Ostwald process =

Chemical process for producing nitric acid

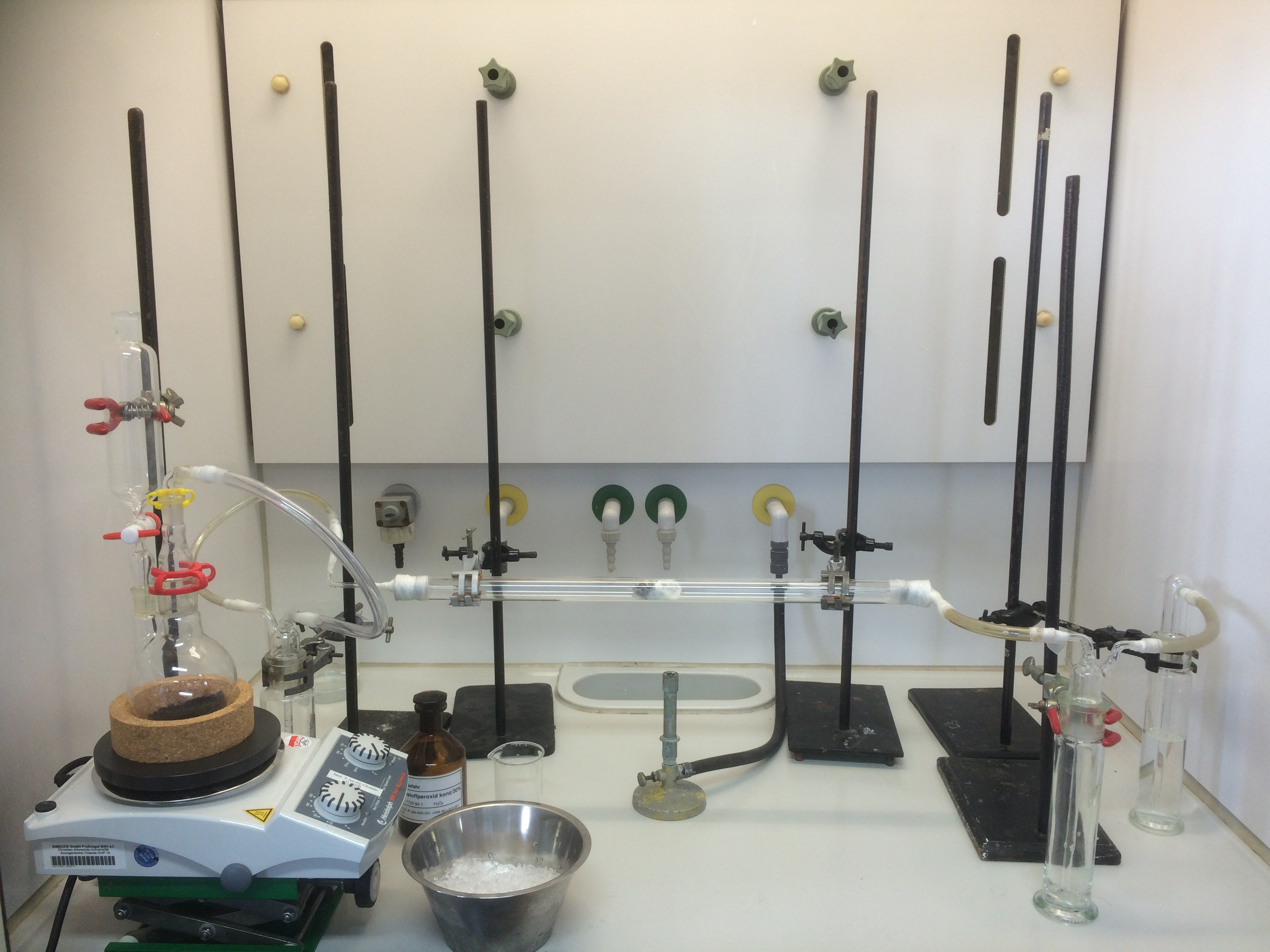
A laboratory setup illustrating the consecutive steps of the Ostwald process for making nitric acid.

The Ostwald process is a chemical process used for making nitric acid (HNO_{3}). The Ostwald process is a mainstay of the modern chemical industry, and it provides the main raw material for the most common type of fertilizer production. Historically and practically, the Ostwald process is closely associated with the Haber process, which provides the requisite raw material, ammonia (NH_{3}). This method is preferred over other methods of nitric acid production because it is less expensive and more efficient.

== Reactions ==
Ammonia is converted to nitric acid in 2 stages.

=== Initial oxidation of ammonia ===
The Ostwald process begins with burning ammonia. Ammonia burns in oxygen at temperature about 900 °C (1,650 °F) and pressure up to 8 standard atmospheres (810 kPa) in the presence of a catalyst such as platinum gauze, alloyed with 10% rhodium to increase its strength and nitric oxide yield, platinum metal on fused silica wool, copper, or nickel to form nitric oxide (nitrogen(II) oxide) and water (as steam). This reaction is strongly exothermic, making it a useful heat source once initiated:

4NH_{3} + 5O_{2} → 4NO + 6H_{2}O (ΔH = −905.2 kJ/mol)

==== Side reactions ====
A number of side reactions compete with the formation of nitric oxide. Some reactions convert the ammonia to N_{2}, such as:

4NH_{3} + 6NO → 5N_{2} + 6H_{2}O

This is a secondary reaction that is minimised by reducing the time the gas mixtures are in contact with the catalyst. Another side reaction produces nitrous oxide:

4NH_{3} + 4O_{2} → 2N_{2}O + 6H_{2}O (ΔH = −1105 kJ/mol)

==== Platinum-rhodium catalyst ====
The platinum and rhodium catalyst is frequently replaced due to decomposition as a result of the extreme conditions which it operates under, leading to a form of degradation called cauliflowering. The exact mechanism of this process is unknown, the main theories being physical degradation by hydrogen atoms penetrating the platinum-rhodium lattice, or by metal atom transport from the centre of the metal to the surface.

=== Secondary oxidation ===
The nitric oxide (NO) formed in the prior catalysed reaction is then cooled down from around 900 °C to roughly 250 °C to be further oxidised to nitrogen dioxide (NO_{2}) by the reaction:

2NO + O_{2} → 2NO_{2} (ΔH = -114.2 kJ/mol)

The reaction:

2NO_{2} → N_{2}O_{4} (ΔH = -57.2 kJ/mol)

also occurs once the nitrogen dioxide has formed.

=== Conversion of nitric oxide ===
Stage two encompasses the absorption of nitrous oxides in water and is carried out in an absorption apparatus, a plate column containing water. This gas is then readily absorbed by the water, yielding the desired product (nitric acid in a dilute form), while reducing a portion of it back to nitric oxide:

3NO_{2} + H_{2}O → 2HNO_{3} + NO (ΔH = −117 kJ/mol)

The NO is recycled, and the acid is concentrated to the required strength by distillation. This is only one of over 40 recorded absorption reactions of nitrogen oxides. If the last step is conducted in air:

4NO_{2} + O_{2} + 2H_{2}O → 4HNO_{3} (ΔH = −348 kJ/mol).

=== Overall reaction ===
The overall reaction is the first equation, 3 times the second equation, and 2 times the last equation; all divided by 2:

2NH_{3} + 4O_{2} + H_{2}O → 3H_{2}O + 2HNO_{3} (ΔH = −740.6 kJ/mol)

Alternatively, if the last step is carried out in the air, the overall reaction is the sum of equation 1, 2 times equation 2, and equation 4; all divided by 2.

Without considering the state of the water,

NH_{3} + 2O_{2} → H_{2}O + HNO_{3} (ΔH = −370.3 kJ/mol)

== History ==
The Ostwald process was developed at the turn of the 20th Century by Wilhelm Ostwald, who demonstrated that ammonia could be catalytically oxidised to nitric oxide using platinum-based catalysts, providing a practical route to nitric acid without the use of natural nitrate sources. In 1902, he patented this process, and early industrial implementations revealed the importance of catalyst composition and operating conditions to maximise yield while limiting ammonia decomposition (mainly high temperatures and short contact times). Subsequent improvements included the adoption of platinum-rhodium gauze catalysts; these increased mechanical stress, reduced platinum losses, and were more stable long-term.

Large-scale deployment of the Ostwald process became economically viable only after the development and industrial implementation of the Haber-Bosch process in 1913, which supplied a continuous, synthetic ammonia feedstock in sufficient quantities to sustain nitric acid production. The integration of the Haber-Bosch process during the First World War enabled Germany to maintain nitric acid production despite Allied blockades of Chilean nitrate imports, making the combined processes strategically significant in the manufacture of explosives as well as fertiliser production. Continued post-war refinements in catalyst design included secondary catchment gauzes containing palladium or gold, which were introduced downstream of the primary catalyst to recover lost platinum.

== See also ==
- Birkeland–Eyde process
