= YGCO Chiyoda Station =

Astronomical observatory in Gunma, Japan

- Observatory code: 897
- Location: Chiyoda, Gunma, Japan
- Coordinates: 36.1937°N 139.4929°E
- Established: 1987

The YGCO Chiyoda Station (YGCO: Yamaneko Group of Comet Observers) is an astronomical observatory based in Chiyoda, Gunma, Japan. It has Observatory code number 897. One of its main tasks is to keep track of and survey near-Earth asteroids. It is maintained by the Yamaneko Group of Comet Observers.
