= Composition =

Composition or Compositions may refer to:

== Arts and literature ==
- Composition (dance), practice and teaching of choreography
- Composition (language), in literature and rhetoric, producing a work in spoken tradition and written discourse, to include visuals and digital space
- Composition (music), an original piece of music, or the process of creating a new piece
- Composition (visual arts), the plan, placement or arrangement of the elements of art in a work
- Composition (Peeters), a 1921 painting by Jozef Peeters
- Composition studies, the professional field of writing instruction
- Compositions (album), an album by Anita Baker
- Digital compositing, the practice of digitally piecing together a still image or video

== Computer science ==
- Compose key, a key on a computer keyboard
- Compositing window manager a component of a computer's graphical user interface that draws windows and/or their borders
- Function composition (computer science), an act or mechanism to combine simple functions to build more complicated ones
- Object composition, combining simpler data types into more complex data types, or function calls into calling functions

== History ==
- Composition of 1867, Austro-Hungarian/German history, (Ausgleich)
- Committee for Compounding with Delinquents, English Civil War
- Composition in the Tudor conquest of Ireland
  - Composition of Connacht

== Mathematics ==
- Binary function, or law of composition
- Function composition, an operation on mathematical functions that yields a single function
- Composition (combinatorics), a way of writing a positive integer as an ordered sum of positive integers
- Composition algebra, an algebra over a field with composing norm: $N(x y) = N(x) N(y)$
- Composition operator, an operator on mathematical functions that yields a single function
- Composition of relations, an operation that takes relations and gives a single relation as the result

== Other uses ==
- Chemical composition, the relative amounts of elements that constitute a substance, or the relative amount of substances that constitute a mixture
- Composition doll, a doll made of a wood-based composite material
- Composition (fine), in legal terminology, a fine accepted in exchange to not prosecute
- Composition material
- Composition (objects), in philosophy, the relationship between a whole and its parts
- Composition ornament or "compo", moulded resin mixture used to form decorative mouldings, particularly for picture frames
- Composition roller, cast from a hide glue and molasses used in brayers and inking rollers for letterpress and other relief printing
- Fallacy of composition, an informal fallacy in which one assumes that a whole has a property solely because its various parts have that property
- Food composition data, information on nutritionally important components of food

== See also ==
- Compo (disambiguation)
- Component (disambiguation)
- Composite (disambiguation)
- Compound (disambiguation)
- Decomposition (disambiguation)
