= Decomposition (disambiguation) =

== Biology and ecology ==
- Decomposition is the process through which organic matter is broken down into simpler molecules.
- Biodegradation

Decomposition, decompose may also refer to:

== Chemistry ==
- Chemical decomposition or analysis, in chemistry, is the fragmentation of a chemical compound into elements or smaller compounds
  - Thermal decomposition, chemical decomposition caused by heat

== Econometrics ==
- Blinder–Oaxaca decomposition, a statistical method that explains the difference in the means of a dependent variable between two groups.

== Mathematics ==
- Decomposition of time series, a statistical task that deconstructs a time series into several components
- Doob decomposition theorem of an integrable, discrete-time stochastic process
- Doob–Meyer decomposition theorem of a continuous-time sub- or supermartingale
- Fourier decomposition, re-expressing a given periodic function as the sum of a series of trigonometric functions
- Graph decomposition, partition of the edge set of a graph
- Hahn decomposition theorem of a measure space
  - Jordan decomposition theorem of a signed measure
- Helmholtz decomposition, decomposition of a vector field
- Indecomposable continuum
- Lebesgue's decomposition theorem, decomposition of a measure
- Lie group decomposition, used to analyse the structure of Lie groups and associated objects
- Manifold decomposition, decomposition of manifolds
  - JSJ decomposition, or toral decomposition, a decomposition of 3-manifolds
- Matrix decomposition, a factorization of a matrix into a product of matrices
  - LU decomposition, a type of matrix factorization
- Permutation decomposition, decomposition of a permutation into disjoint cycles
- Primary decomposition, decomposition of ideals into primary ideals
- Tree decomposition, homomorphism of a graph to a tree
- Vector decomposition, decomposition of vectors into components or coordinates of basis vectors
- Wavelet decomposition, re-expressing a given function as the sum of a series of wavelet functions

== Physics ==
- Spinodal decomposition, phase separation mechanism

== Other uses ==
- Decomposition (computer science), or factoring; the process of breaking a complex problem down into easily understood and achievable parts
  - Decomposition method (disambiguation), solutions of various problems and design of algorithms
  - Functional decomposition, expressing a function as the composition of two functions
- Semantic decomposition (natural language processing)
- Decompositions: Volume Number One, the second studio album by American screamo band Circle Takes the Square
- Zersetzung, or decomposition, a debilitative psychological warfare technique utilised by the Stasi intelligence agency in East Germany

== See also ==
- Breakdown (disambiguation)
- Component (disambiguation)
- Composite (disambiguation)
- Composition (disambiguation)
- Compound (disambiguation)
- Decay (disambiguation)
- Food spoilage
- Indecomposability (disambiguation)
