= STEVE =

Atmospheric optical phenomenon, which appears as a light ribbon in the sky

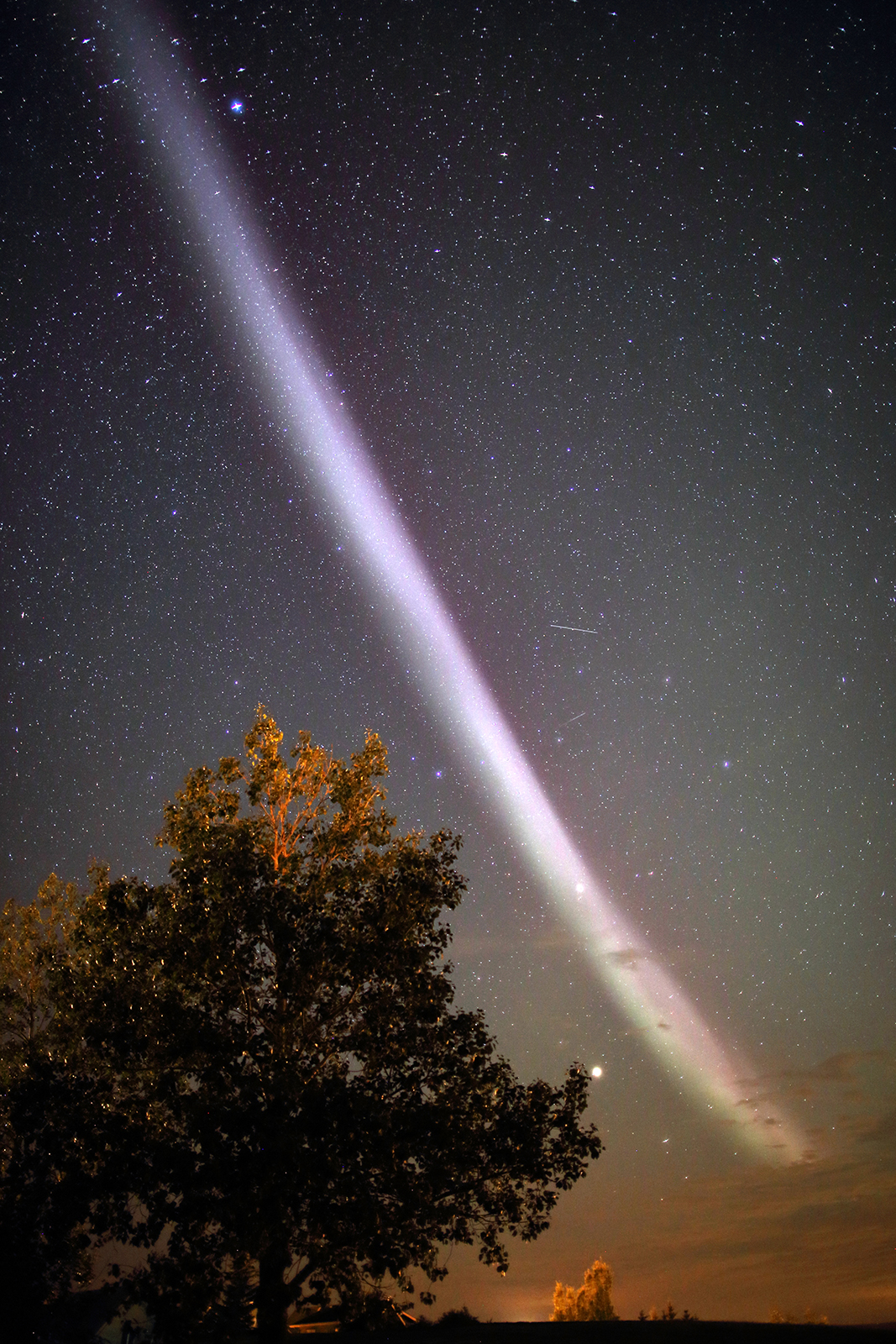
A STEVE over Little Bow Resort, Alberta, in August 2015

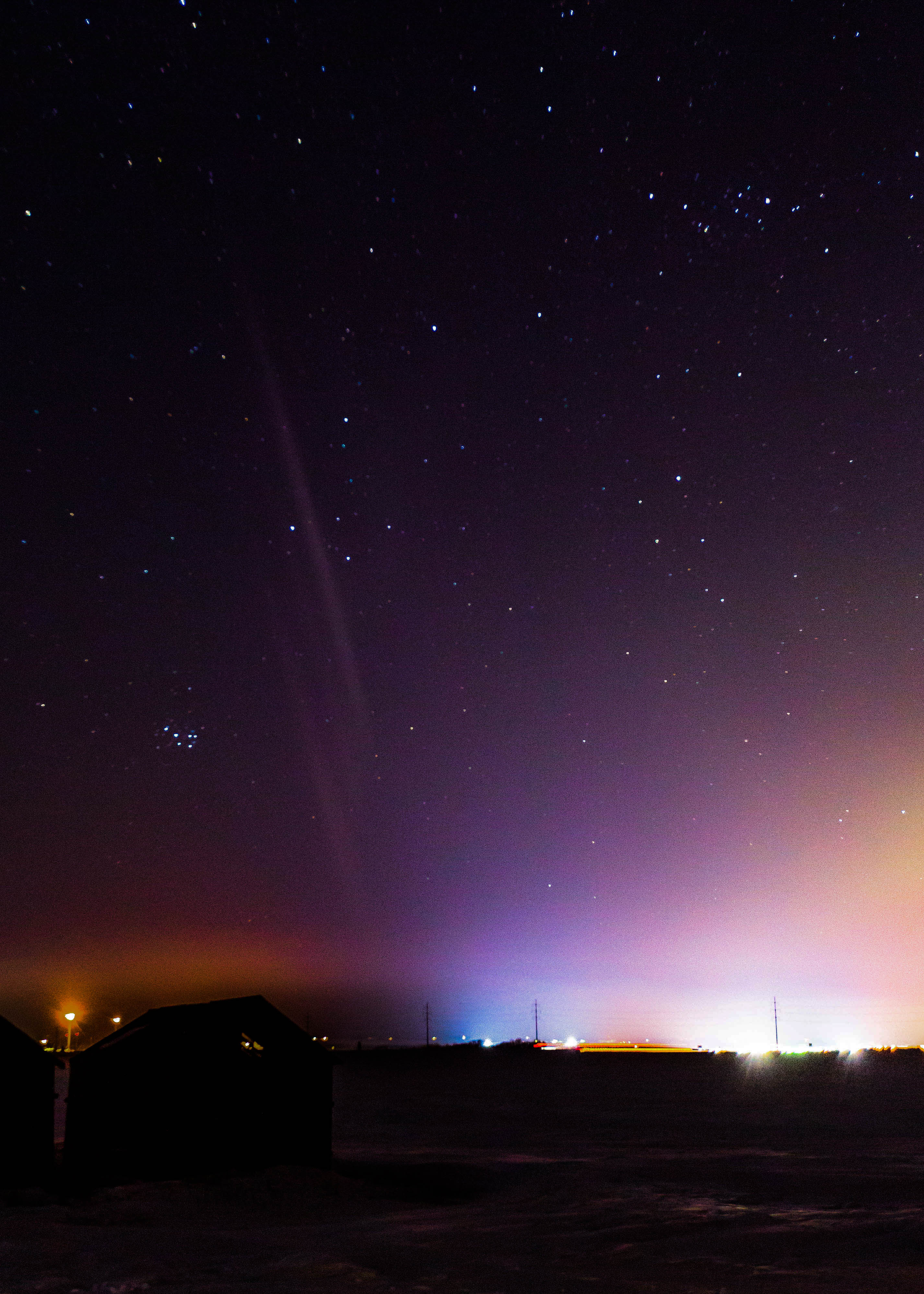
A STEVE over Crossfield, Alberta, in March 2018 (around 12:30 a.m.)

STEVE is an atmospheric optical phenomenon that appears as a purple and green light ribbon in the night sky, named in late 2016 by aurora watchers from Alberta, Canada. The backronym later adopted for the phenomenon is the Strong Thermal Emission Velocity Enhancement. According to analysis of satellite data from the European Space Agency's Swarm mission, the phenomenon is caused by a 25 km (16 mi) wide ribbon of hot plasma at an altitude of 450 km (280 mi), with a temperature of 3,000 °C (3,270 K; 5,430 °F) and flowing at a speed of 6 km/s (3.7 mi/s) (compared to 10 m/s (33 ft/s) outside the ribbon). The phenomenon is not rare, but had not been investigated and described scientifically prior to that time.

== Discovery and naming ==
The STEVE phenomenon has been observed by auroral photographers for decades. Some evidence suggests that STEVE observations may have been recorded as early as 1705. Notations resembling the phenomenon exist in some observations from 1911 to the 1950s by Carl Størmer.

The first accurate determination of the nature of the phenomenon was not made, however, until after members of a Facebook group, Alberta Aurora Chasers, named it, attributed it to a proton aurora, and began calling it a "proton arc". When physics professor Eric Donovan from the University of Calgary saw their photographs and suspected that their determination was incorrect because proton auroras are not visible, he correlated the time and location of the phenomenon with Swarm satellite data and one of the Alberta Aurora Chaser photographers, Song Despins. She provided GPS coordinates from Vimy, Alberta, that helped Donovan link the data to identify the phenomenon.

One of the aurora watchers, photographer Chris Ratzlaff, suggested using the name "Steve" for the phenomenon, in reference to Over the Hedge, an animated comedy movie from 2006. The characters in the movie give the name to a hedge that appears overnight, in order to make it seem more benign. Reports of the heretofore undescribed and unusual "aurora" went viral as an example of citizen science on Aurorasaurus.

During the fall meeting of the American Geophysical Union in December 2016, Robert Lysak suggested using a backronym of "Steve" for the phenomenon that would stand for a "Strong Thermal Emission Velocity Enhancement". That acronym, "STEVE", has been adopted by the team at NASA Goddard Space Flight Center that is studying the phenomenon.

External media

Images
- Photograph of the phenomenon
- Gallery

Video
- Time-lapse phenomenon on YouTube

== Occurrence and cause ==
=== Location and timing ===
STEVE phenomena may be spotted further from the poles than the aurora, and as of March 2018, have been observed in the United Kingdom, Canada, Alaska, northern U.S. states, Australia, New Zealand and Denmark. The phenomenon appears as a very narrow arc extending for hundreds or thousands of kilometers, aligned east–west. It generally lasts for twenty minutes to an hour. As of March 2018, STEVE phenomena have only been spotted in the presence of an aurora. None were observed from October 2016 to February 2017, or from October 2017 to February 2018, leading NASA to believe that STEVE phenomena may only appear during certain seasons. However, STEVE phenomena have since been reported and photographed in South Australia during a geomagnetic storm event on 11 October 2024.

=== Research into cause ===
A study published in March 2018 by Elizabeth A. MacDonald and co-authors in the peer-reviewed journal, Science Advances, suggested that the STEVE phenomenon accompanies a subauroral ion drift (SAID), a fast-moving stream of extremely hot particles. STEVE marks the first observed visual effect accompanying a SAID.

In August 2018, researchers determined that the skyglow of the phenomenon was not associated with particle precipitation (electrons or ions) and, as a result, could be generated in the ionosphere.

One proposed mechanism for the glow is that excited nitrogen breaks apart and interacts with oxygen to form glowing nitric oxide.

=== Association with picket-fence aurora ===
Often, although not always, a STEVE phenomenon is observed above a green, "picket-fence" aurora according to a study published in Geophysical Research Letters. Although the picket-fence aurora is created through precipitation of electrons, they appear outside the auroral oval and so their formation is different from traditional aurora. The study also showed these phenomena appear in both hemispheres simultaneously. Sightings of picket-fence aurora have been made without observations of STEVE.

The green emissions in the picket fence aurora seem to be related to eddies in the supersonic flow of charged particles, similar to the eddies seen in a river that move more slowly than the water around them. Hence, the green bars in the picket fence are moving more slowly than the structures in the purple emissions and some scientists have speculated they could be caused by turbulence in the charged particles from space.

== See also ==
- Space weather
- Thermosphere
- Solar prominence
- Upper-atmospheric lightning
- Unusual types of aurorae
- FrontierSat
