= Kasha Patel =

American science writer (born 1991)

- Kasha Patel in 2024
- Born: July 18, 1991 (age 35); Fairmont, West Virginia, U.S.
- Education: Wake Forest University (BA); Boston University

Comedy career
- Years active: 2014–present
- Medium: Stand-up; podcasting
- Genres: Observational comedy; insult comedy; satire
- Subjects: science; current events; dating; gender equality; gender roles; gender differences; feminism; race relations; religion; self-deprecation; NASA
- Website: Official website

Kasha Patel (born July 18, 1991) is an American science writer, stand-up comedian, voice artist, and podcaster. She currently works as the deputy weather editor for the Washington Post. She has produced the only regularly-recurring science comedy shows in the United States since 2014. Before her time at the Washington Post, she was known as a digital storyteller for the NASA Earth Observatory.

== Early life ==
Kasha Patel was born in Fairmont, West Virginia. She is of Indian descent. Patel graduated from high school in 2008. In 2012, Patel obtained a bachelor's degree in chemistry from Wake Forest University. Before starting her comedy career, she also attended Boston University to study science journalism.

== Career ==
She moved to Washington, D.C. in 2013. Patel's comedy career began in 2014.

In 2015, Patel published a study of the citizen science effort Aurorasaurus St. Patrick's Day Storm.

Patel performed at the 2018 American Association for the Advancement of Science conference where she also presented several topics for NASA. In 2018, Patel was featured as one of the top undiscovered comedians in the US.

Patel has also discussed her synthesis of science and comedy during a TEDx Tysons event.

In 2023, the Discovery Channel announced that Kasha would be the host of the Shark Week podcast.
