= Rundown (disambiguation) =

Rundown may refer to:

- Rundown, an event in a baseball game
- Run down, a stew dish in Jamaica and Tobago
- Rundown (Scientology), a set of procedures
- RunDown Funk U Up, album by D'banj
- The Rundown, a 2003 film
- The Rundown (Singaporean TV program), business news, 2014–2018
- The Rundown with José Diaz-Balart, an American political talk show
- The Rundown with Robin Thede, an American talk show
- MFC 31: Rundown, a 2011 mixed martial arts event in Edmonton, Canada

== See also ==
- Decay (disambiguation)
- Dilapidation, for example a run-down building
