= Liz MacDonald =

American space weather scientist

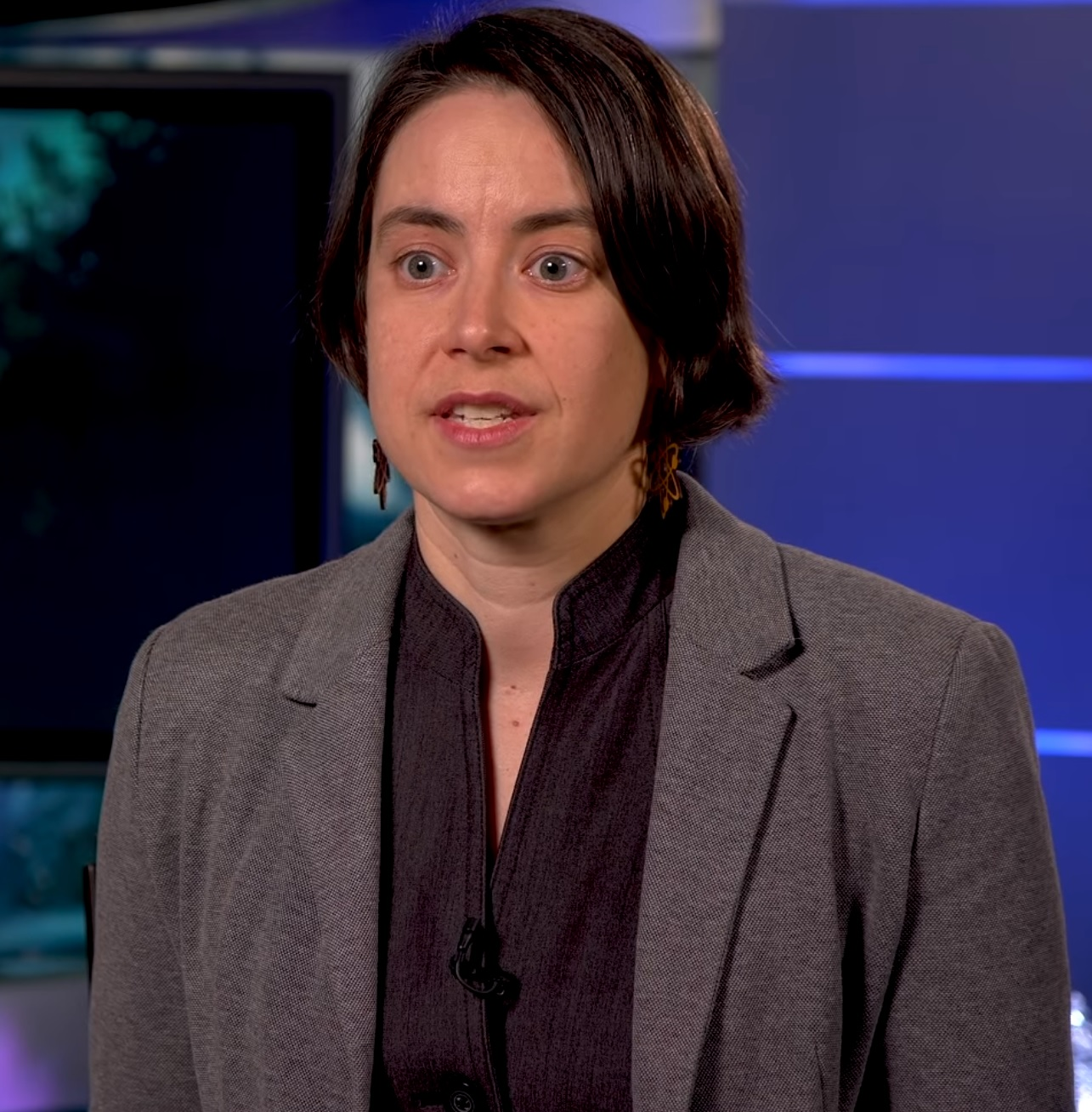
- MacDonald discussing the STEVE aurora in 2018
- Education: University of New Hampshire University of Washington
- Known for: Aurorasaurus
- Scientific career
- Workplaces: Los Alamos National Laboratory Goddard Space Flight Center

Elizabeth MacDonald is a space physicist who works at NASA Goddard Space Flight Center. She is a co-investigator on the Helium, Oxygen, Proton, and Electron Spectrometer on the NASA Radiation Belts Storm Probe mission.

== Education ==
Elizabeth MacDonald was born in Walla Walla, Washington, to Bill and Alice MacDonald. MacDonald received a BSc in physics from the University of Washington, funded by a NASA Space Grant scholarship, in 1999. Her mentor, Ruth Skoug, encouraged her to remain in research. MacDonald completed her postgraduate studies at the University of New Hampshire, earning her PhD in physics in 2004.

== Career ==
MacDonald specializes in plasma mass spectrometry, and has expertise in instrument development and data analysis and interpretation.

After completing her PhD, MacDonald joined Los Alamos National Laboratory. At LANL she was the principal investigator for the Z-Plasma Spectrometer on the Department of Energy Space and Atmospheric Burst Reporting System geosynchronous payload. She also led the Innovative Research and Integrated Sensing team. She was principal investigator for the Advanced Miniaturized Plasma Spectrometer. She received the Los Alamos Awards Program recognition three times.

Between 2009 and 2011 she led the Department of Energy funded Modular Advanced Space Environment Instrumentation. In 2012 she became a New Mexico Consortium-affiliated researcher, working on the prototype for the Aurorasaurus citizen science project. She has served on scientific review panels for the National Science Foundation and Los Alamos National Laboratory grants. Today MacDonald works in the Goddard Space Flight Center.

In 2018 MacDonald and her team announced the discovery of a new aurora called Strong Thermal Emission Velocity Enhancement (STEVE). STEVE is farther from the poles than the aurora is typically seen. The European Space Agency Swam A satellite was used to identify that the charged particles in STEVE were around 6000 °C. It was observed by Canadian aurora enthusiasts in 2015. MacDonald attributes the faint purple glow to a subauroral ion drift. MacDonald published the finding in Science Advances. She is working with NASA to crowd source sightings of STEVE.

== Awards and honors ==
In 2018, MacDonald was named as a Walla Walla Public Schools Graduate of Distinction as a "pioneer in citizen science initiatives and mentor for aspiring scientists of all ages".

== Public engagement ==
In 2016 in the journal Space Weather, MacDonald and co-workers reported that "citizen scientists are regularly able to spot auroras farther south of an area where prediction models indicated". MacDonald leads an interdisciplinary citizen science project called Aurorasaurus, which uses social media to predict the Northern Lights during the current solar maximum. To fund the program, she won a $1-million INSPIRE grant from the National Science Foundation together with Andrea Tapia of Pennsylvania State University and Michelle Hall of Science Education Solutions.

After noticing a spike in tweets about an aurora borealis in October 2011, she established Aurorasaurus to track such geolocation information in order to improve forecasting, such as that done by NOAA's Space Weather Prediction Center.

In August 2017, she spoke at the Carl Sandburg Home National Historic Site about the 2017 solar eclipse. MacDonald regularly speaks to high school students and community groups.
