= Composite =

Composite or compositing may refer to:

== Materials ==
- Composite material, a material that is made from several different substances
  - Metal matrix composite, composed of metal and other parts
  - Cermet, a composite of ceramic and metallic materials
  - Dental composite, a substance used to fill cavities in teeth
  - Composite armor, a type of tank armor
- Alloy, a mixture of a metal and another element
- Mixture, the combination of several different substances without chemical reaction

== Mathematics ==
- Composite number, a positive integer that has at least one factor other than one or itself

== Science ==
- Composite particle, a particle which is made up of smaller particles
- Compositae or "composite family" of flowering plants
- Composite volcano, a layered conical volcano
- Compositing, another name for superposed epoch analysis, a statistical method used to analyze time series involving multiple events

== Technology ==
- Compositing, combining of visual elements from separate sources into single images
  - Digital compositing
- Composite pattern, a software design pattern used for computer programming
- Composite video, an analogue video signal format
- Composite portrait, a compositing of images such as faces to produce an Ideal type
- Composite ship, a marine vessel with a design incorporating both wood and metal for the body
- Composite bow, in archery, made of multiple materials, in contrast to an all-wood bow
- Compositing window manager, a window manager that gives every window an off-screen buffer

== Other ==
- Composite card, a marketing tool for actors and models
- Composite character, a character in an adaptation of a work formed from two or more characters from the original work
- Composite monarchy, a category for several countries under one ruler
- Composite motion, in parliamentary procedure, created by assimilating multiple motions into one
- Composite order, in architecture, a type of capital on a column
- Facial composite, an approximate likeness of a person's face based on an eyewitness's description
- Composite (finance), a proxy for financial markets performance
- Composite coach, a railway carriage with seating for more than one class of passenger

== See also ==
- Compound (disambiguation)
