= B+ decay =

B+ decay may refer to:

- Positron emission (beta plus decay)
- B meson decay

== See also ==
- Particle decay
- Decay (disambiguation)
