= Decomposition method =

Decomposition method is a generic term for solutions of various problems and design of algorithms in which the basic idea is to decompose the problem into subproblems. The term may specifically refer to:

- Decomposition method (constraint satisfaction) in constraint satisfaction
- Decomposition method (multidisciplinary design optimization) in multidisciplinary design optimization
- Decomposition method (queueing theory), in queueing network analysis
- Adomian decomposition method, a non-numerical method for solving nonlinear differential equations
- Domain decomposition methods in mathematics, numerical analysis, and numerical partial differential equations
- Cholesky decomposition method

== See also ==
- Decomposition (disambiguation)
