= The Compound (disambiguation) =

The Compound is an area in Florida.

The Compound may also refer to:

- The Compound (Bodeen novel), by S. A. Bodeen, 2008
- The Compound (Rawle novel), by Aisling Rawle, 2025
- The Compound (restaurant), Santa Fe, New Mexico, U.S.

== See also ==
- Compound (disambiguation)
