= Magnetic midnight =

Astronomical phenomenon

In the field of astronomy, the magnetic midnight of the North or South Magnetic Pole occurs when the pole is exactly between the sun and an observer on Earth's surface. At that moment, the pole's aurora reaches its largest extent.

Because Earth's magnetic poles do not coincide with its geographical poles—the angle between Earth's rotation axis and magnetic axis is about 11°—magnetic midnight differs from conventional midnight. In most of the United States, magnetic midnight occurs about an hour earlier.
