= Component =

Component may refer to:

== In engineering, science, and technology ==
=== Generic systems ===
- System components, an entity with discrete structure, such as an assembly or software module, within a system considered at a particular level of analysis
- Lumped element model, a model of spatially distributed systems

=== Electrical ===
- Component video, a type of analog video information that is transmitted or stored as two or more separate signals
- Electronic component, a constituent of an electronic circuit
- Symmetrical components, in electrical engineering, analysis of unbalanced three-phase power systems

=== Mathematics ===
- Color model, a way of describing how colors can be represented, typically as multiple values or color components
- Component (group theory), a quasi-simple subnormal sub-group
- Connected component (graph theory), a maximal connected subgraph
- Connected component (topology), a maximal connected subspace of a topological space
- Vector component, result of the decomposition of a vector into various directions

=== Science ===
- Component (thermodynamics), a chemically independent constituent of a phase of a system

=== Software ===
- Component (UML), definition of component in the Unified Modeling Language
- Component-based software engineering, a field within software engineering dealing with reusable software elements
- Software component, a reusable software element

=== Chinese ===
Chinese character component, a structural unit between Chinese character strokes and Chinese whole characters.

== Other uses ==
- Component (VTA), a light-rail station in San Jose, California
- Part of the grammatical structure of a sentence, a concept relating to the catena
- Component ingredient, in a culinary dish

== See also ==
- Composition (disambiguation)
- Decomposition (disambiguation)
- Giant component
- Identity component
- Irreducible component
- Spare part
- Strongly connected component
- Tangential and normal components
- Category:Components
