= Compound operation =

Compound operation may refer to:

- Compound operation (dies), in die manufacturing
- Compound operation (computing), in computing
  - Compound assignment, in computing
- Compound operation (engines), in engines
- Compound operation (steam engines), in steam engines
- Compound operation (locomotives), in locomotives

== See also ==
- Compound operator
- Fused operation
- Transpositional inversion
- Compound (disambiguation)
