= Aurora (heraldry) =

Heraldic charge

Aurora in the arms of Murmansk Oblast (on the silhouette of a trimount)

Aurora is used as a charge in heraldry. The use of the aurora is often connected with a northern geographic position. The aurora is often made in silver or gold and is a band of floating bends.

The aurora is often called polar light or northern light. It is used in many arms in Russian Murmansk Oblast.

== Examples ==
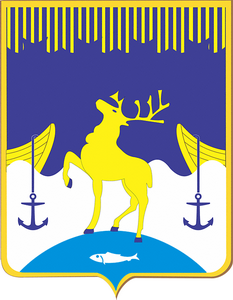
As chief, bendwise stylized (Ostrovnoy, Russia)

As wreath of rays at base of the shield (Utsjoki, Finland)

As a wreath of rays in chief (Kuusamo, Finland)

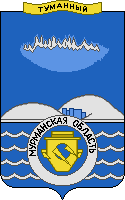
naturalistic (Tumanny, Russia)
