= Keogram =

Method of capturing aurora

A keogram (below) showing the plot based on the marked slice of the images (above) taken by the camera.

A keogram ("keo" from "Keoeeit" – Inuit word for "Aurora Borealis") is a way of displaying the intensity of an auroral display over time. It creates a time-dependent graph by taking a narrow slice of a series of images recorded by a camera, more specifically and ideally a "whole sky camera". Keograms are usually created from a north-south oriented slice of the images, with north at the top in the Northern Hemisphere and south at the top in the Southern Hemisphere. This allows one to easily see the general activity of the display that night, interruptions by clouds, and the regions in which the aurora was seen in terms of latitude.

The use of keograms started in the 1970s by Eather et al. to allow a more practical and efficient way of determining the activity of the aurora throughout the recorded night and provide a view of the movements of it. Cameras can also record in wavelengths outside of the human visible spectrum. Thus, keograms can also be used to analyse the conditions of the equatorial plasma bubbles (EPB) in the ionosphere of the Earth, to estimate its zonal drift.

== See also ==
- Aurora
- Night sky
