= S. A. Bodeen =

American author

S. A. Bodeen (or Stephanie Stuve-Bodeen) is an American children's and young adult book author. She is best known for her young adult science fiction novels The Compound and The Gardener, and books for children and adults like A Small Brown Dog with a Wet Pink Nose and for her picture books about Elizabeti, a young Tanzanian girl. The first book in the series, Elizabeti's Doll, won the 1999 Ezra Jack Keats New Writer Award from the New York Public Library, and was named a Charlotte Zolotow Award Highly Commended Title.

== Bibliography ==
=== As Stephanie Stuve-Bodeen ===
- Elizabeti’s Doll, Lee & Low Books, 1998
- We’ll Paint the Octopus Red, Woodbine House, 1998
- Mama Elizabeti, Lee & Low Books, 2000
- Elizabeti’s School, Lee & Low Books, 2002
- Babu’s Song, Lee & Low Books, 2003
- The Best Worst Brothers, Woodbine House, 2005
- A Small Brown Dog with a Wet Pink Nose, Little, Brown Books for Young Readers, 2009

=== As S. A. Bodeen ===
- The Compound, Feiwel and Friends, 2008
- The Gardener, Square Fish, 2011
- The Raft, Feiwel and Friends/Macmillan, 2012
- The Fallout, Feiwel and Friends, 2013
- Shipwreck Island, Feiwel and Friends, 2014
- Lost, Feiwel and Friends, 2015
- The Detour, Feiwel and Friends, 2015
- Trapped, Feiwel and Friends, 2016
- Found, Feiwel and Friends, 2017
- The Tomb, Feiwel and Friends, 2018
