= Subauroral ion drift =

Atmospheric phenomenon

A subauroral ion drift (SAID), also known as a polarisation jet, is an atmospheric phenomenon driven by substorms in the Earth's magnetosphere. First discovered in 1971, a SAID is a latitudinally narrow (1-2° MLAT) layer of rapid, westward flowing ions in the Earth's ionosphere. Though not traditionally associated with an optical emission, the STEVE discovery paper suggested the first link between this optical emission's occurrence and that of an extremely fast and hot SAID event.

SAIDs are observed equatorward of the auroral zone, at subauroral latitudes, typically in the local time sector between 18:00 hours and 22:00 hours. They can occur individually, or as multiple events. SAIDs are characterised by a reduced density of ions, a strong westward flow, and an increased temperature. They can last between 30 minutes and 3 hours. The exact characteristics of SAID events appear to have solar cycle, seasonal, and diurnal dependences.

Although studied for decades, prior to the formal discovery of STEVE, SAIDs had never been associated with an optical emission. STEVE was associated with a particularly extreme SAID, with a velocity over twice the norm and 100 K hotter. STEVE has presented a new way for scientists, including citizen scientists, to study SAIDs.
