= Composition (Peeters) =

Painting by Jozef Peeters

Composition is a 1921 painting by Jozef Peeters. It is now catalogue number in 2924 in the Royal Museum of Fine Arts, Antwerp.
