= The Compound (Bodeen novel) =

2008 novel by S. A. Bodeen

- Author: S. A. Bodeen
- Cover artist: David Cooper
- Language: English
- Series: The Compound
- Genre: Dystopia, adventure
- Publisher: Feiwel & Friends
- Publication date: April 29, 2008
- Publication place: United States
- English publication date: 2008
- Media type: Print, ebook, audiobook
- Pages: 256 pages
- ISBN: 0312575394

The Compound is a 2008 fictional young adult novel by S. A. Bodeen. The book was first released on April 29, 2008, through Feiwel & Friends and centers upon a young man named Eli who has been living in a compound for six years. Bodeen came up with the idea of including cannibalism in the novel after watching a television show where "a dinosaur fed a favorite offspring the bodies of its less fortunate brothers and sisters."

== Plot ==
Eli Yanakakis is a fifteen-year-old boy who has been living in an underground compound for the past six years since he was nine. His father, the wealthy Rex Yanakakis, built it in anticipation of a world-shattering nuclear attack. The facility is fully furnished and contains everything from a movie theater to an extensive library. It even has the capability to raise livestock, enabling the Yanakakis family to maintain a stable food supply for at least fifteen years, the time it would take for conditions outside the compound to return to habitable levels. Yet Eli is desperately unhappy, as his twin brother, Eddy, and his grandmother are not there with him, as they were left outside the compound when his family fled.

As time passes in the compound, Eli's mother, Clea, gives birth to three children and is ready to give birth to a fourth. The children are kept in a separate room and Eli avoids ever meeting them, knowing that his father plans on using them as "supplements" for the family's diet. Despite this, he is still horrified when he discovers that his father plans on cloning a human being in order to provide meat for the family. Eli eventually gives in to his mother and meets the supplements. He grows to care for them, even trying to persuade one of his other siblings to help save the supplements from their seemingly inevitable death.

Eli eventually stumbles outside his father's office and discovers an active internet connection. Through this, he discovers that his brother is not only still alive, but that there was no nuclear attack and that everyone believed the Yanakakises died in a fire. Eddy also informs Eli that insanity runs in their family and that their father will likely harm them all. Angry, Eli confronts his father, who admits that he created the entire thing as an experiment to test how far everyone would go to survive and to what lengths. Eli manages to knock his father unconscious and brings him to the infirmary, where Eli's mother is beginning to bleed profusely from her pregnancy. Knowing that he must get them out before his father wakes, Eli tries to use a series of clues to discover the combination to the compound's door. He fails to discover and memorize the code before his father reawakens and his father ends up threatening to kill one of his siblings if Eli does not hand over the code. Eli does but manages to figure out the code with the help of his sisters. He is successful in opening the door and escaping, but is locked out of the compound by his father without his other family members.

Once outside, Eli is horrified to discover his father has made plans to have an associate help move the family to another compound and destroy the previous one. He tackles his father's associate, but in the process activates the bomb that will destroy the compound. Eli manages to help his mother and siblings escape, but his father runs into the compound in order to save his research. Scared, abandoned, and uncertain if his father has managed to escape or not, Eli and his remaining family wait in the woods, not knowing what will happen next. They are surprised when a helicopter arrives, containing Eli's brother Eddy and a search party. The book concludes with Eli's mother giving birth and the FBI continuing their search for the whereabouts of Rex Yanakakis. Despite this, Eli remains hopeful about what the future might bring for him.

== Reception ==
Critical reception for The Compound was mostly positive, with Publishers Weekly, Horn Book Guide, and the School Library Journal giving positive reviews. AudioFile praised the audiobook's narration, stating that "the exciting plot twists and explosive action keep listeners engaged".

=== Awards ===
- 2008 Cuffies: Honorable Mention
- 2008 AudioFile Earphones Award Winner
- 2009 Texas Lone Star Reading List
- 2009 YALSA Amazing Audiobooks for Young Adults
- 2009 YALSA Quick Picks for Reluctant Young Adult Readers
- 2010-2011 Maryland Black-Eyed Susan Award for sixth to ninth grade books
- 2012 Young Hoosier Book Award (Middle Grade)
- 2013 YALSA Popular Paperbacks for Young Adults

== Sequel ==
In 2013, Bodeen announced that she was working on a sequel to The Compound, entitled The Fallout. The story picks up a month after the events in the prior book and follows the Yanakakis family as they must deal with the aftermath of their time in the compound. Bodeen stated that she hadn't initially planned to write a sequel, but decided to write one after multiple readers asked her what happened after Eli and his family escaped the compound.

The book was released on September 24, 2013, through Feiwel & Friends.
