= Aurorasaurus =

Citizen science project

Aurorasaurus is a citizen science project which tracks auroras through crowdsourced observations from a mobile app and social media, namely Twitter and Facebook.

== Development ==
Aurorasaurus was created by Liz MacDonald, a space physicist at NASA Goddard Space Flight Center in Greenbelt, Maryland, after she noticed a large amount of tweets about auroras during a 2011 solar storm that produced red auroras visible from Alabama. With Goddard scientist Nathan Case, MacDonald created a real-time map that displays the location of tweets that talk about auroras and have geolocation data.

Aurorasaurus has been supported by NASA and the National Science Foundation. It has been developed through a collaboration between NASA, the non-profit New Mexico Consortium, Pennsylvania State University, and the company Science Education Solutions.

== Usage ==
External videos
- Prime Model and "Aurorasaurus" Auroral Observations, NASA Video, 0:47, March 7, 2016

Aurorasaurus contains a real-time map that displays the location of tweets that talk about auroras and have geolocation data. Users then verify if the tweets indicate a sighting. Aurorasaurus also plots a "view-line" onto the map which shows users the predicted area in which they can see the aurora according to the National Oceanic and Atmospheric Administration's aurora forecast model OVATION Prime. Once enough users report a sighting in an area or around the view-line, a notification is sent to other users in the local area.

Hundreds of citizen science observations collected by the Aurorasaurus team from March to April 2015 showed that more people reported seeing auroras closer to the equator than modeled by OVATION Prime. In 2016, Pennsylvania State University information scientists explored how Aurorasaurus could be used as an early warning system for emergency responders.
