= Optical decay =

Optical decay is process of relaxation of excitation of an excited quantum system, usually due to the spontaneous emission of a photon or a phonon. Optical decay is dominant mechanism of quenching of excitation of active optical media. In solid-state lasers the optical decay limits the storage of energy in active medium.

Also, the term optical decay is used to the effect of quick reduction of luminosity of astrophysical objects

== Phenomenology of optical decay ==
In the first approximation, the optical decay can be treated as just spontaneous emission, and its rate is determined with the Einstein Coefficients. For the most of laser systems, the effects of decoherence determine the spectral width of the emitted photons, and there is no reason to consider in detail the evolution of isolated quantum-mechanical systems which show the optical decay.

== Shape of spectral line at the optical decay of an idealized atom ==
The "isolated" quantum system (atom, ion, molecule or even a quantum dot) may have metastable states, weakly coupled to the outer world. (Some couliknd should be taken into account; otherwise, there is no optical decay.) In the idealized case, the evolution of the system is disturbed only by the interaction with the continuum of the modes of the electromagnetic field. Then, the spectral width of the emitted photons is determined by the relaxation rate. For the narrow spectral lines, the decay is almost exponential; then, the profile of the spectral line is determined by the Fourier transform of the exponential decay of the quantum amplitude of probability that the system is still excited; this profile is Lorentian.

== Deformed vacuum ==
The decay rate can be affected by the distortion of uniform density of states of photons, due, for example, an external cavity or a nanofiber located in vicinity of the atom or by simply placing the system near a dielectric or metallic boundary.
