= Decomposition method (queueing theory) =

In queueing theory, a discipline within the mathematical theory of probability, the decomposition method is an approximate method for the analysis of queueing networks where the network is broken into subsystems which are independently analyzed.

The individual queueing nodes are considered to be independent G/G/1 queues where arrivals are governed by a renewal process and both service time and arrival distributions are parametrised to match the first two moments of data.
