= Composite portrait =

Galton's technique for creating a generic image of all members of a photographed group

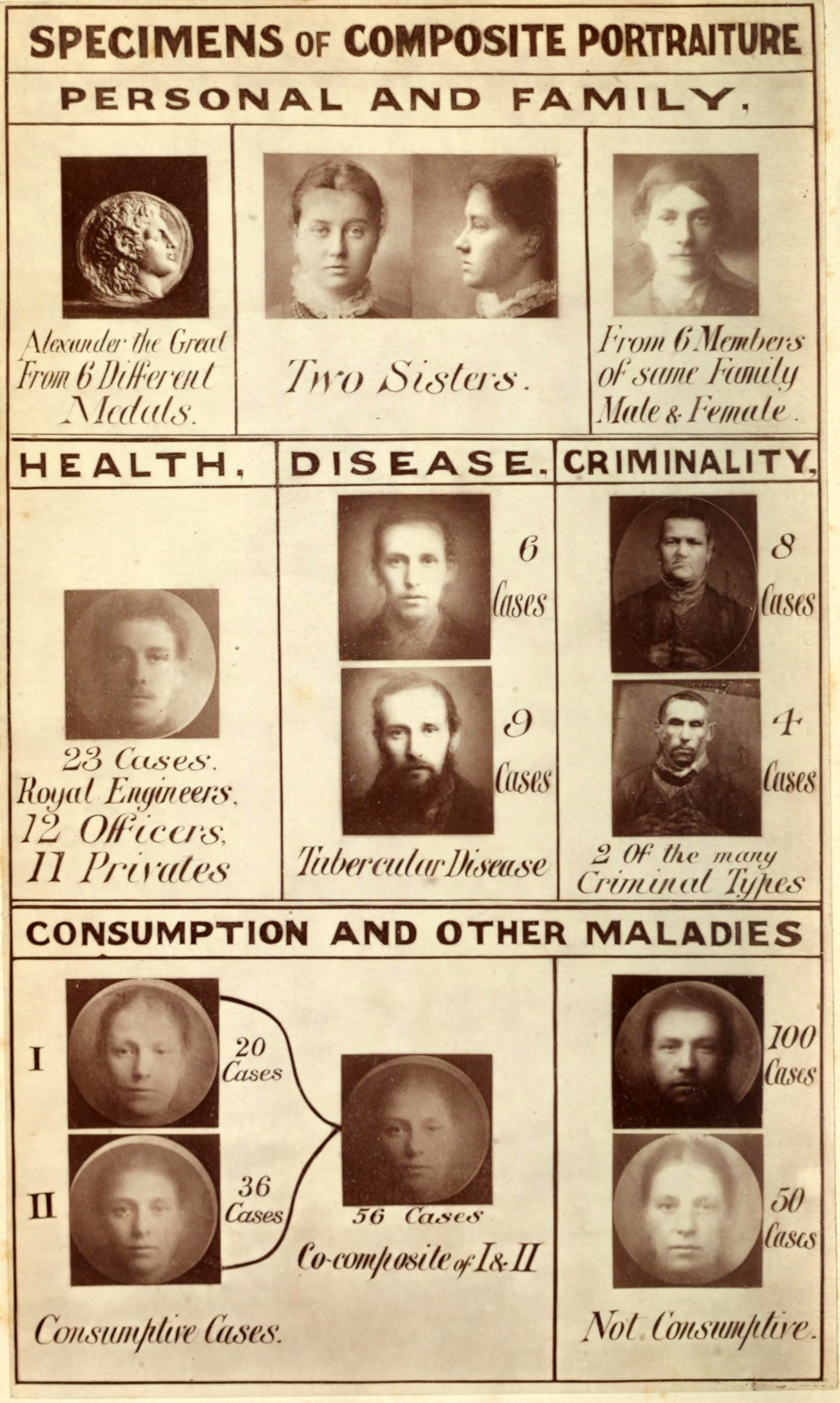
Composite portraiture, Francis Galton, 1883.

Composite portraiture (also known as composite photographs) is a technique invented by Sir Francis Galton in the 1880s after a suggestion by Herbert Spencer for registering photographs of human faces on the two eyes to create an "average" photograph of all those in the photographed group.

Spencer had suggested using onion paper and line drawings, but Galton devised a technique for multiple exposures on the same photographic plate. He noticed that these composite portraits were more attractive than any individual member, and this has generated a large body of research on human attractiveness and averageness one hundred years later. He also suggested in a Royal Society presentation in 1883 that the composites provided an interesting concrete representation of human ideal types and concepts. He discussed using the technique to investigate characteristics of common types of humanity, such as criminals. In his mind, it was an extension of the statistical techniques of averages and correlation. In this sense, it represents one of the first implementations of convolution factor analysis and neural networks in the understanding of knowledge representation in the human mind. Galton also suggested that the technique could be used for creating natural types of common objects.

During the late 19th century, English psychometrician Sir Francis Galton attempted to define physiognomic characteristics of health, disease, beauty, and criminality, via a method of composite photography. Galton's process involved the photographic superimposition of two or more faces by multiple exposures. After averaging together photographs of violent criminals, he found that the composite appeared "more respectable" than any of the faces comprising it; this was likely due to the irregularities of the skin across the constituent images being averaged out in the final blend. Since the advancement of computer graphics technology in the early 1990s, Galton's composite technique has been adopted and greatly improved using computer graphics software.
