= Compositing (democracy) =

Process of combining several motions into one composite motion

In deliberative procedure, compositing is the process of combining several motions into one composite motion.

The process of compositing motions may be desirable for two reasons. First, it can save the time of an assembly by avoiding presenting two or more similar motions. Second, it can increase the amount of support for the main provisions of two or more motions by producing a composite motion for which the supporters of each motion are likely to vote.

The major disadvantages of compositing are also twofold. The motions composited may, in some respects, be dissimilar: some of their supporters will not wish to vote for some provisions of the combined motion. Some provisions may have to be omitted from the composite motions - to reduce its length or because the supporters of the original motions will not agree to them.

The procedure of submitting motions to some conferences includes one or more rounds of compulsory compositing; in other cases, the compositing may be informal.
