= Decay =

Decay may refer to:

== Science and technology ==
- Bit decay, in computing
- Decay time (fall time), in electronics
- Distance decay, in geography
- Software decay, in computing

=== Biology ===
- Decomposition of organic matter
- Mitochondrial decay, in genetics
- Tooth decay (dental caries), in dentistry

=== Physics ===
- Optical decay, in quantum physics
- Orbital decay, the process of prolonged reduction in the height of a satellite's orbit
- Particle decay
- Radioactive decay
- False vacuum decay

=== Mathematics ===
- Exponential decay

=== Psychology and sociology ===
- Decay theory, in psychology and memory
- Social decay (decadence), in sociology
- Urban decay, in sociology

== Entertainment ==
- Network decay (channel drift), in television programming
- Decay (DC Comics), a comic book character
- Decay (comics), a Marvel Comics character and member of the Acolytes
- Decay (X-Factor), a Marvel Comics character and member of Serval X-Factor
- Half-Life: Decay, a 2001 video game add-on
- Deekay, a Danish production team
- Decay (professional wrestling), a professional wrestling stable in TNA Wrestling

=== Film ===
- Decay (2012 film), a 2012 zombie film set at the Large Hadron Collider
- Decay (2015 film), a 2015 American film

=== Music ===
- how quickly the sound drops to the sustain level after the initial peak, see ADSR envelope
- Decay (Wretched album), 2025
- Decay (Godflesh album), 2026
- "Decay" (Ride song)
- "Decay" (Biohazard song)
- "Decay" (Sevendust song), 2013
- Decay Music, 1976 album by Michael Nyman
- In Decay, 2012 album by Com Truise
- The Years of Decay, 1989 album by Overkill (band)

== Other ==
- Beta decay (finance)

== See also ==
- Weathering
- Decomposition (disambiguation)
