= Indecomposability =

Indecomposability or indecomposable may refer to any of several subjects in mathematics:

- Indecomposable module, in algebra
- Indecomposable distribution, in probability
- Indecomposable continuum, in topology
- Indecomposability (intuitionistic logic), a principle in constructive analysis and in computable analysis
- Indecomposability of a polynomial in polynomial decomposition
- A property of certain ordinals; see additively indecomposable ordinal
