= Compo =

Compo may refer to:

- Compo Simmonite, a character from the British TV series Last of the Summer Wine, played by Bill Owen
- Demoscene compo, a competition involving multimedia "demo" programs
- Short for composition ornament, a mouldable resin worked either by hand or more usually pressed into moulds to produce decorative work
- Slang word for British Army field rations
- Slang word for financial compensation
- Compo Company, a former record company in Canada which evolved into Universal Music Canada
- Compo, Connecticut, a residential and beach area of Westport, Connecticut
  - The Compo–Owenoke Historic District
- Compo (film), a 1989 Australian film
- Charles Compo, American composer and musician
