= Compound =

Compound may refer to:

== Architecture and built environments ==
- Compound (enclosure), a cluster of buildings having a shared purpose, usually inside a fence or wall
  - Compound (fortification), a version of the above fortified with defensive structures
- Compound (migrant labour), a hostel for migrant workers such as those historically connected with mines in South Africa
- Komboni or compound, a type of slum in Zambia

== Government and law ==
- Composition (fine), a legal procedure in use after the English Civil War
  - Committee for Compounding with Delinquents, an English Civil War institution that allowed Parliament to compound the estates of Royalists
- Compounding treason, an offence under the common law of England
- Compounding a felony, a previous offense under the common law of England

== Linguistics ==
- Compound (linguistics), a word that consists of more than one radical element
- Compound sentence (linguistics), a type of sentence made up of two or more independent clauses and no subordinate (dependent) clauses

== Science, technology, and mathematics ==
=== Biology and medicine ===
- Compounding, the mixing of drugs in pharmacy
- Compound fracture, a complete fractures of bone where at least one fragment has damaged the skin, soft tissue or surrounding body cavity
- Compound leaf, a type of leaf being divided into smaller leaflets

=== Chemistry and materials science ===
- Chemical compound, combination of two or more elements
- Plastic compounding, a method of preparing plastic formulations

=== Vehicles and engines ===
- Compound engine, a steam engine in which steam is expanded through a series of two or three cylinders before exhaust
- Turbo-compound engine, an internal combustion engine where exhaust gases expand through power-turbines
- Compounding pressure, a method in which pressure in a steam turbine is made to drop in a number of stages

=== Other uses in science, technology, and mathematics ===
- Compound bow, a type of bow for archery
- Polyhedral compound, a polyhedron composed of multiple polyhedra sharing the same centre

== Other uses ==
=== Common names ===
- Compound (music), an attribute of a time signature
- Compound interest, in finance, unpaid interest that is added to the principal
- Compound chocolate, an inexpensive chocolate substitute that uses cocoa but excludes cocoa butter

=== Proper names ===
- Compound (company), a venture capital firm previously known as Metamorphic Ventures
- Eisenhuth Horseless Vehicle Company, or Compound, a former US automobile manufacturer

== See also ==
- The Compound (disambiguation)
- Compound operation (disambiguation)
- Composite (disambiguation)
