= Aurora =

Atmospheric effect caused by the solar wind

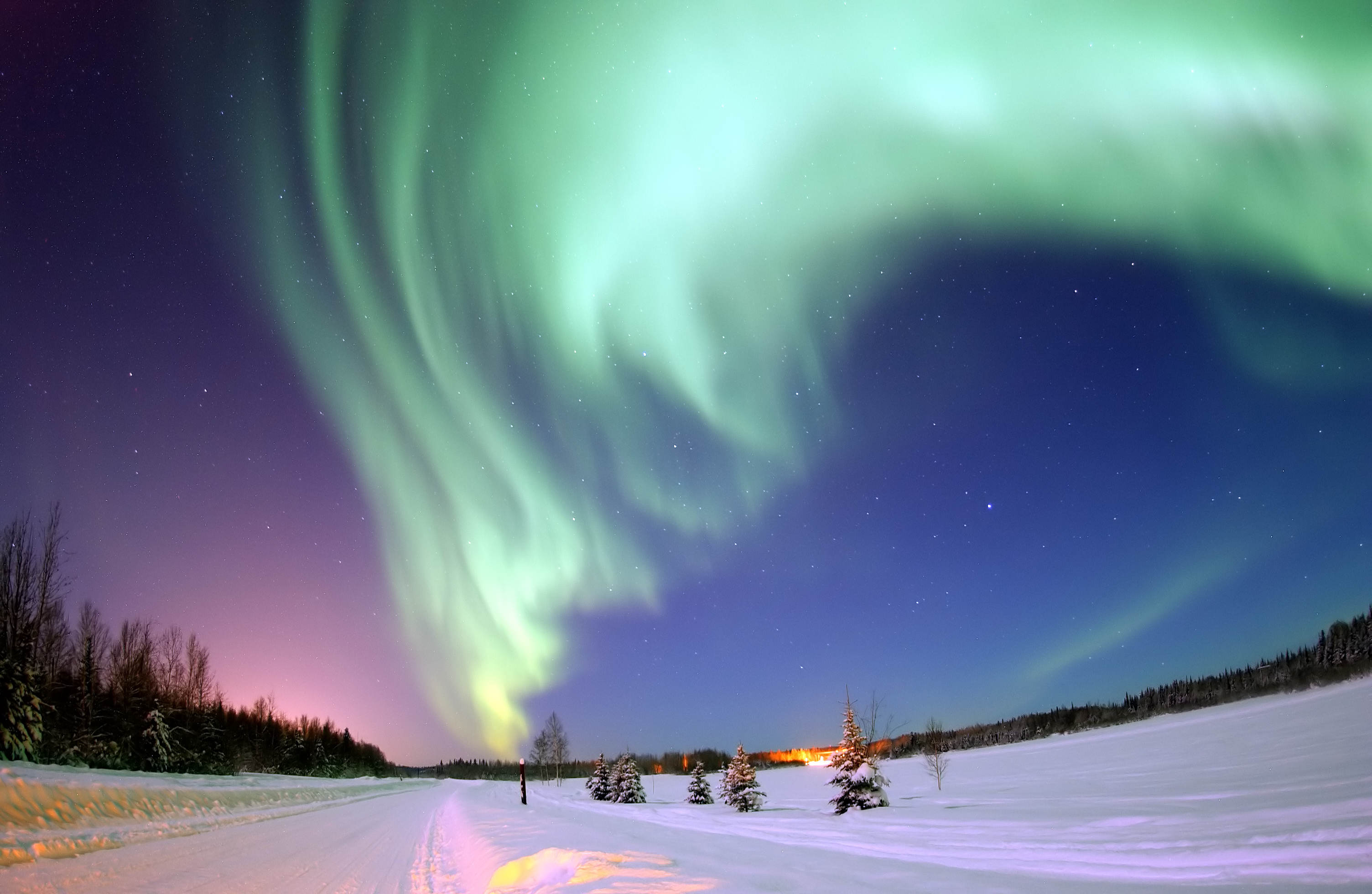
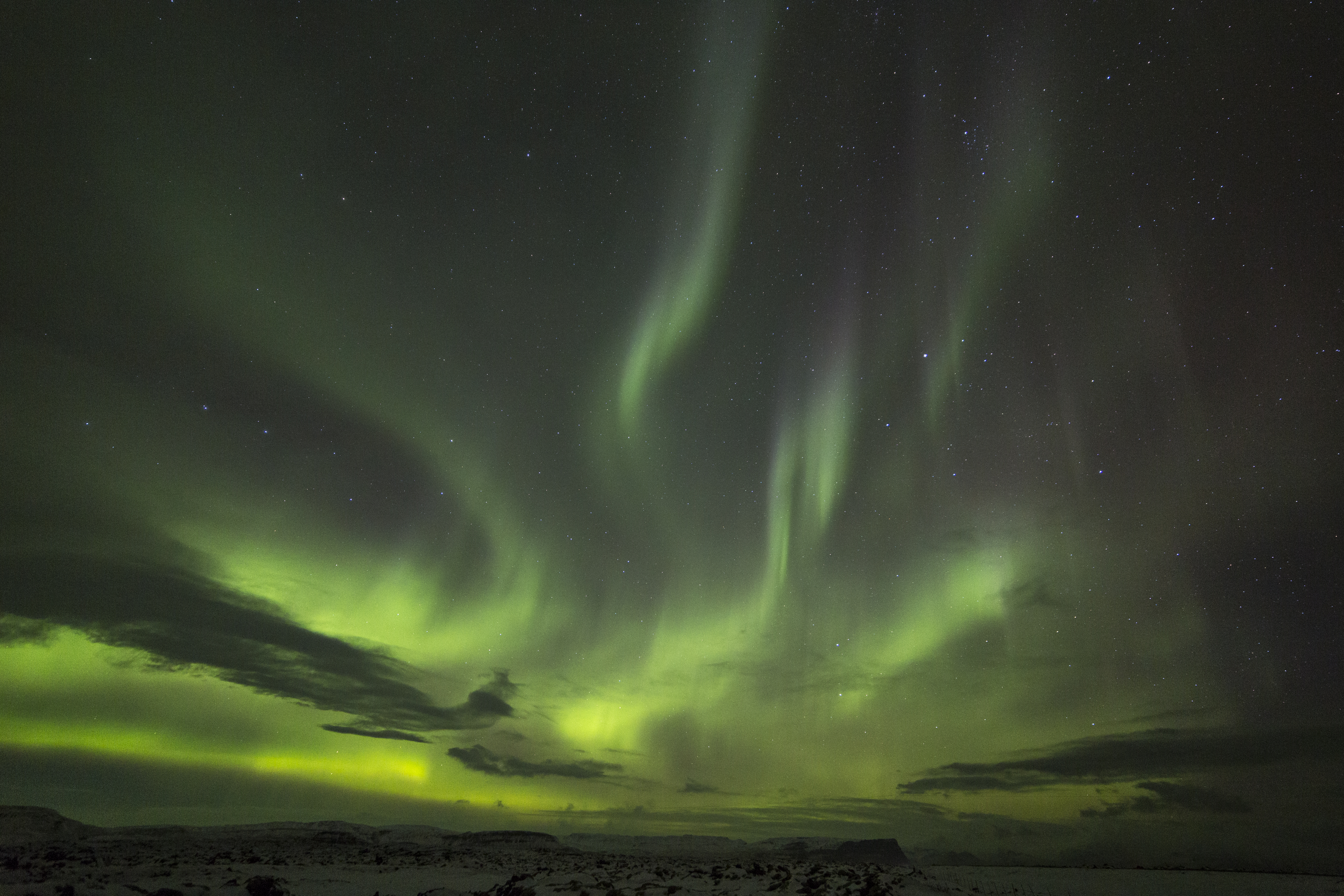
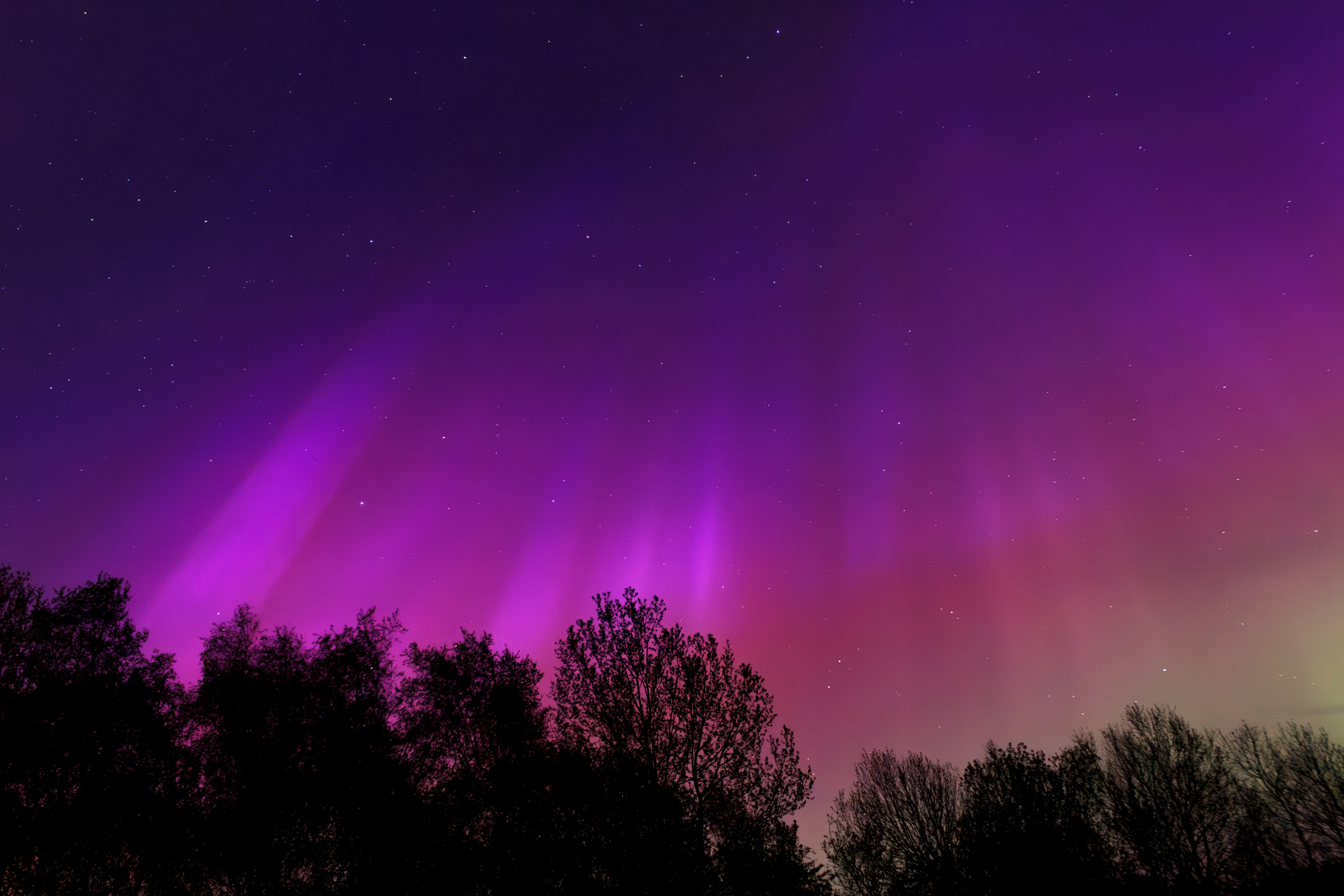
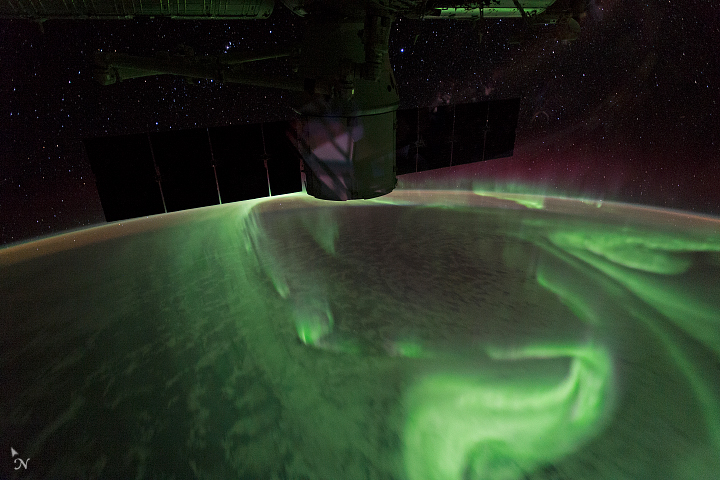
Images of auroras from across the world, including those with rarer red and blue lights

An aurora (pl. aurorae or auroras) is a natural light display in Earth's upper atmosphere caused by charged particles from the Sun colliding with atoms in the atmosphere. These collisions excite oxygen and nitrogen, which then emit light of different colours such as green, red, and purple. When observed in high-latitude regions they are called polar lights and aurora polaris. In the Arctic they are called the northern lights or aurora borealis; in the Antarctic, the term southern lights or aurora australis is used. Auroras display dynamic patterns of radiant light that appear as curtains, rays, spirals or dynamic flickers covering the entire sky.

Auroras are the result of disturbances in the Earth's magnetosphere caused by enhanced speeds of solar wind from coronal holes and coronal mass ejections. These disturbances alter the trajectories of charged particles in the magnetospheric plasma. These particles, mainly electrons and protons, precipitate into the upper atmosphere (thermosphere/exosphere). The resulting ionization and excitation of atmospheric constituents emit light of varying colour and complexity. The form of the aurora, occurring within bands around both polar regions, is also dependent on the amount of acceleration imparted to the precipitating particles.

Other planets in the Solar System, brown dwarfs, comets, and some natural satellites also host auroras.

== Etymology ==
The term aurora borealis appeared in a 1649 description by Pierre Gassendi of an auroral display visible all over France in 1621. Gassendi had read the works of Galileo Galilei, who used the term in his extensive writings about aurora in 1619. The term entered the English language in 1828.

The word aurora is derived from the name of the Roman goddess of the dawn, Aurora, who travelled from east to west announcing the coming of the Sun. Aurora was first used in English in the 14th century. The words borealis and australis are derived from the names of the ancient gods of the north wind (Boreas) and the south wind (Auster or australis) in Greco-Roman mythology.

=== Grammar ===
Modern style guides recommend that the names of meteorological phenomena, such as aurora borealis, be uncapitalized. The term "auroras" is the more common plural in the U.S.; however, aurorae is the original Latin plural and is often used by scientists. In some contexts, aurora is an uncountable noun, multiple sightings being referred to as "the aurora".

== Characterisation ==
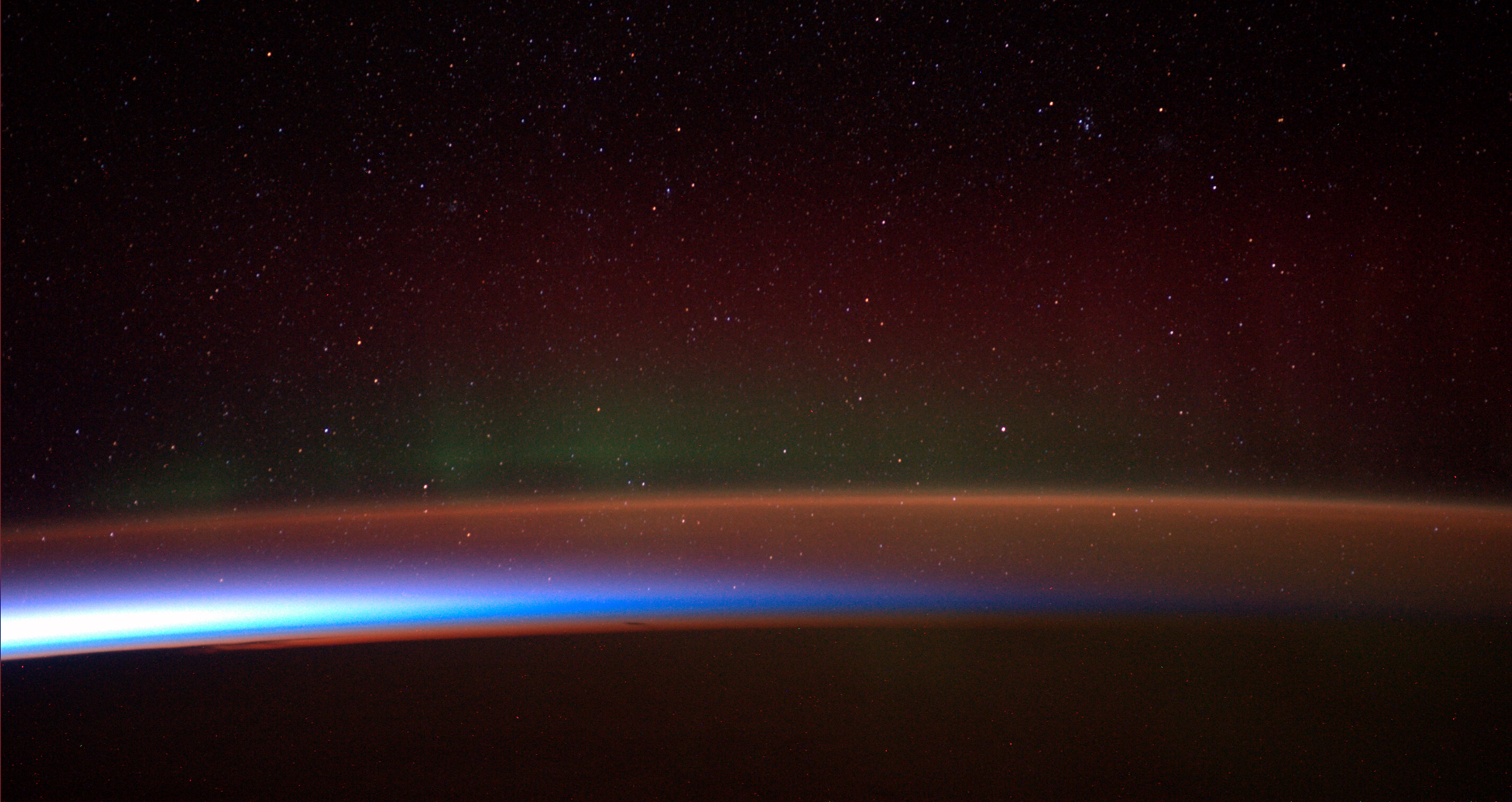
Earth's night-side upper atmosphere appears from the bottom as bands of afterglow illuminating the troposphere in orange with silhouettes of clouds at the top, and the stratosphere in white and blue at the top of the middle. Next, the mesosphere (pink area) extends to the orange and faintly green line of the lowest airglow, at about one hundred kilometres at the edge of space and the lower edge of the thermosphere (invisible). Continuing with green and red bands of auroras stretching over several hundred kilometres.

Auroras are most commonly observed in the "auroral zone", a band approximately 6° (~660 km) wide in latitude centred on 67° north and south. The region that currently displays an aurora is called the "auroral oval". The oval is displaced by the solar wind, pushing it about 15° away from the geomagnetic pole (not the geographic pole) in the noon direction and 23° away in the midnight direction. The peak equatorward extent of the oval is displaced slightly from geographic midnight. It is centred about 3–5° nightward of the magnetic pole so that auroral arcs reach furthest toward the equator when the magnetic pole in question is in between the observer and the Sun, which is called magnetic midnight.

Early evidence for a geomagnetic connection comes from the statistics of auroral observations. Elias Loomis (1860), and later Hermann Fritz (1881) and Sophus Tromholt (1881) in more detail, established that the aurora appeared mainly in the auroral zone.

In northern latitudes, the effect is known as the aurora borealis or the northern lights. The southern counterpart, the aurora australis or the southern lights, has features almost identical to the aurora borealis and changes simultaneously with changes in the northern auroral zone. The aurora australis is visible from high southern latitudes in Antarctica, Patagonia, southeastern Australia, New Zealand, and the Falkland Islands. The aurora borealis is visible from areas around the Arctic such as Alaska, Canada, Iceland, Greenland, the Faroe Islands, Scandinavia, Finland, Scotland, and Russia. A geomagnetic storm causes the auroral ovals (north and south) to expand, bringing the aurora to lower latitudes or higher in the south. On rare occasions, the aurora borealis can be seen as far south as the Mediterranean, East Asia, and the southern states of the US, while the aurora australis can be seen as far north as New Caledonia, South Africa, the Pilbara region in Western Australia, and Uruguay. During the Carrington Event, the greatest geomagnetic storm ever observed, auroras were seen even in the tropics.

Auroras seen within the auroral oval may be directly overhead. The NOAA Space Weather Prediction Center publishes a short-term forecast of the oval's location and intensity from the OVATION model, driven by solar-wind measurements at the L1 point and giving 30 to 90 minutes of lead time. From farther away, they illuminate the poleward horizon as a greenish glow, or sometimes a faint red, as if the Sun were rising from an unusual direction. Auroras also occur poleward of the auroral zone as either diffuse patches or arcs, which can be subvisual.

Videos of the aurora australis taken by the crew of Expedition 28 on board the International Space Station

This sequence of shots was taken on 17 September 2011 from 17:22:27 to 17:45:12 GMT, on an ascending pass from south of Madagascar to just north of Australia over the Indian Ocean.

This sequence of shots was taken on 7 September 2011 from 17:38:03 to 17:49:15 GMT, from the French Southern and Antarctic Lands in the South Indian Ocean to southern Australia.

This sequence of shots was taken on 11 September 2011 from 13:45:06 to 14:01:51 GMT, from a descending pass near eastern Australia, rounding about to an ascending pass to the east of New Zealand.

NOAA maps of Aurora Borealis and Australis

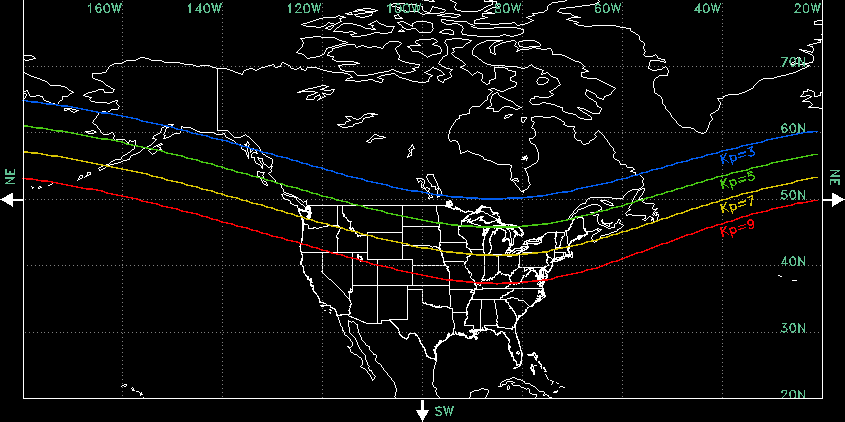
North America

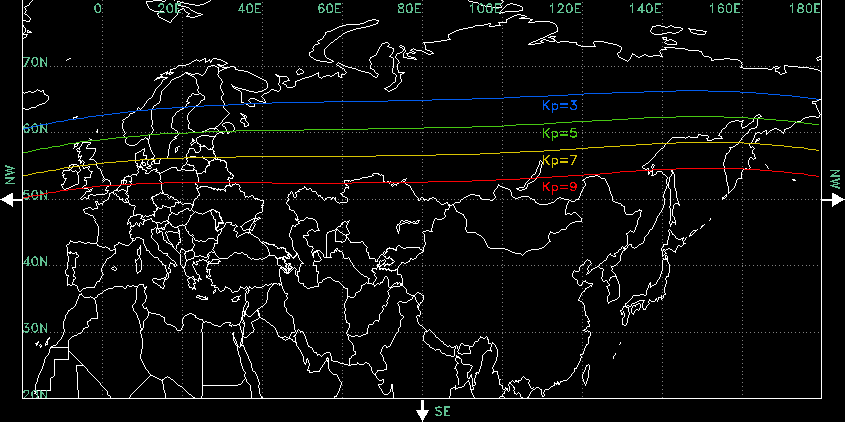
Eurasia

South America

Africa and Oceania

These maps show the local midnight equatorward boundary of the aurora at different levels of geomagnetic activity as of 28 October 2011 – these maps change as the location of the geomagnetic poles change. A K-index of K_{p}= 3 corresponds to relatively low levels of geomagnetic activity, while K_{p}= 9 represents high levels.

Auroras are occasionally seen in latitudes below the auroral zone when a geomagnetic storm temporarily enlarges the auroral oval. Large geomagnetic storms are most common during the peak of the 11-year sunspot cycle or during the three years after the peak. An electron spirals (gyrates) about a field line at an angle that is determined by its velocity vectors, parallel and perpendicular, respectively, to the local geomagnetic field vector B. This angle is known as the "pitch angle" of the particle. The distance, or radius, of the electron from the field line at any time is known as its Larmor radius. The pitch angle increases as the electron travels to a region of greater field strength nearer to the atmosphere. Thus, it is possible for some particles to return, or mirror, if the angle becomes 90° before entering the atmosphere to collide with the denser molecules there. Other particles that do not mirror enter the atmosphere and contribute to the auroral display over a range of altitudes. Other types of auroras have been observed from space; for example, "poleward arcs" stretching sunward across the polar cap, the related "theta aurora", and "dayside arcs" near noon. These are relatively infrequent and poorly understood. Other interesting effects occur such as pulsating aurora, "black aurora" and their rarer companion "anti-black aurora" and subvisual red arcs. In addition to all these, a weak glow (often deep red) is observed around the two polar cusps, the field lines separating the ones that close through Earth from those that are swept into the tail and close remotely.

=== Altitude ===
Video of the complete aurora australis by IMAGE, superimposed over a digital image of Earth

Starting in 1911, Carl Størmer and his colleagues used cameras to triangulate more than 12,000 auroras. They found no auroras below 70 km (43 mi) and only 6.5% above 150 km (93 mi), with a maximum in the height distribution around 100 km (62 mi).

=== Forms ===
According to Clark (2007), there are five main forms that can be seen from the ground, from least to most visible:

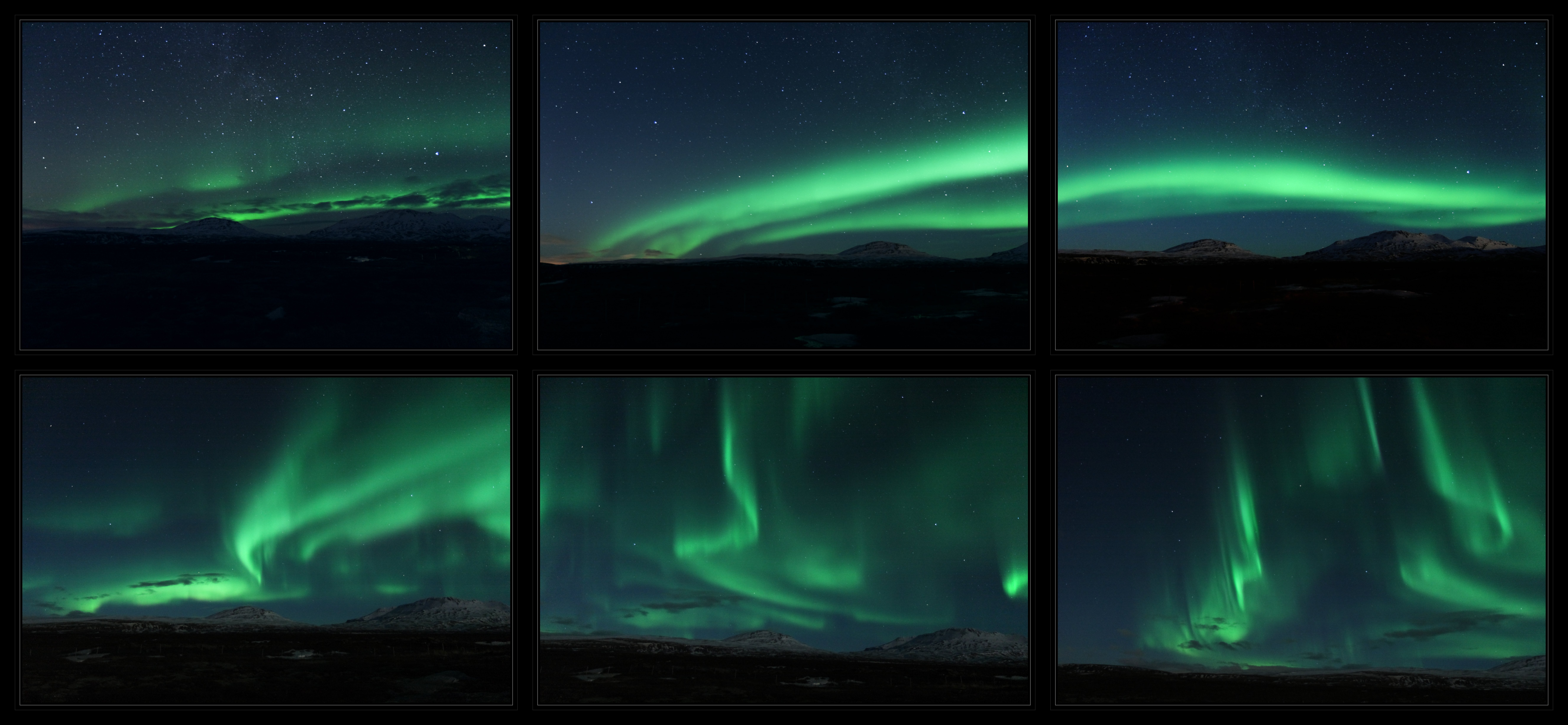
Different forms

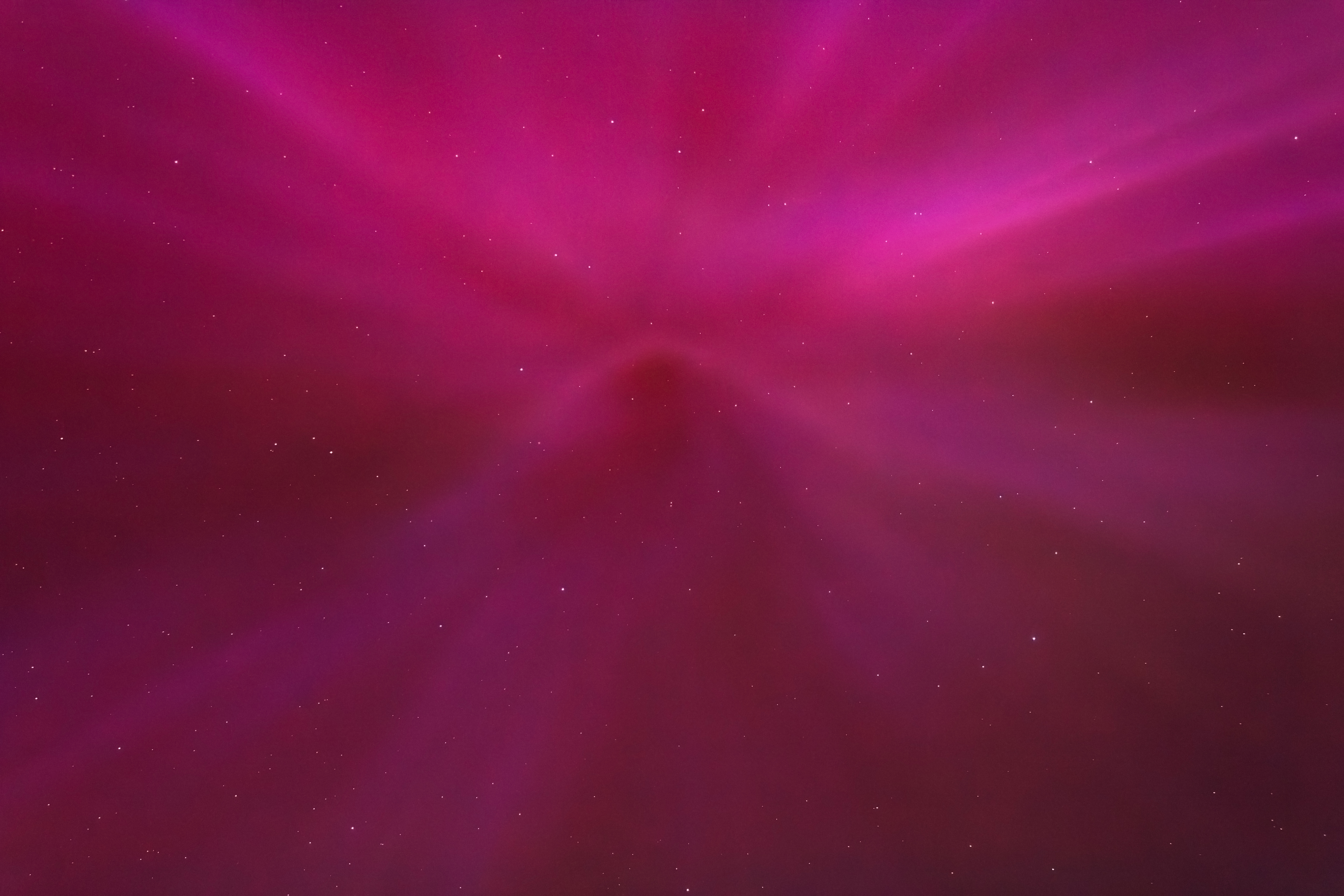
Divergence point of a coronal aurora

- A mild glow, near the horizon. These can be close to the limit of visibility, but can be distinguished from moonlit clouds because stars can be seen undiminished through the glow.
- Patches or surfaces that look like clouds.
- Arcs curve across the sky.
- Rays are light and dark stripes across arcs, reaching upwards by various amounts.
- Coronas cover much of the sky and diverge from one point on it.

Brekke (1994) also described some auroras as "curtains". The similarity to curtains is often enhanced by folds within the arcs. Arcs can fragment or break up into separate, at times rapidly changing, often rayed features that may fill the whole sky. These are also known as discrete auroras, which are at times bright enough to read a newspaper at night.

These forms are consistent with auroras being shaped by Earth's magnetic field. The appearances of arcs, rays, curtains, and coronas are determined by the shapes of the luminous parts of the atmosphere and a viewer's position.

=== Colours and wavelengths of auroral light ===
- Red: At its highest altitudes, excited atomic oxygen emits at 630 nm (red); low concentration of atoms and lower sensitivity of eyes at this wavelength make this colour visible only under more intense solar activity. The low number of oxygen atoms and their gradually diminishing concentration is responsible for the faint appearance of the top parts of the "curtains". Scarlet, crimson, and carmine are the most often seen hues of red for the auroras.
- Green: At lower altitudes, the more frequent collisions suppress the 630 nm (red) mode: rather the 557.7 nm emission (green) dominates. A fairly high concentration of atomic oxygen and higher eye sensitivity in green make green auroras the most common. The excited molecular nitrogen (atomic nitrogen being rare due to the high stability of the N_{2} molecule) plays a role here, as it can transfer energy by collision with an oxygen atom, which then radiates it away at the green wavelength. (Red and green can also mix together to produce pink or yellow hues.) The rapid decrease in concentration of atomic oxygen below about 100 km is responsible for the abrupt-looking end of the lower edges of the curtains. Both the 557.7 and 630.0 nm wavelengths correspond to forbidden transitions of atomic oxygen, a slow mechanism responsible for the graduality (0.7 s and 107 s respectively) of flaring and fading.

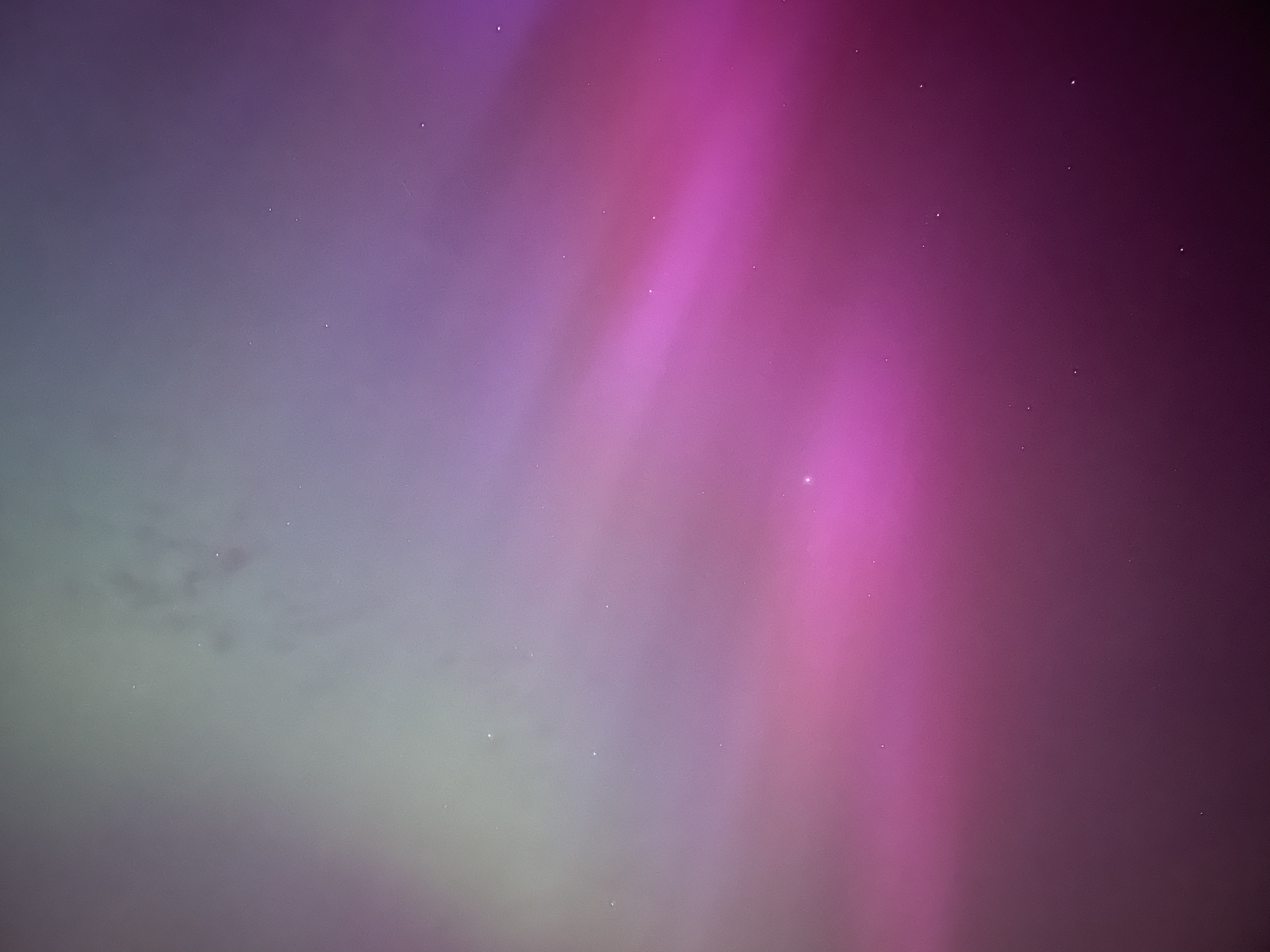
2024 appearance seen in England radiating blue through red aurora

- Blue: At yet lower altitudes, atomic oxygen is uncommon, and molecular nitrogen and ionized molecular nitrogen take over in producing visible light emission, radiating at a large number of wavelengths in both red and blue parts of the spectrum, with 428 nm (blue) being dominant. Blue and purple emissions, typically at the lower edges of the "curtains", show up at the highest levels of solar activity. The molecular nitrogen transitions are much faster than the atomic oxygen ones.
- White/continuum: White auroral emission (often appearing mauve) has been observed in the colour spectrum of STEVE, and within the aurora in the oval and on the poleward edge. The white colour is due to the pseudo-continuum spectrum of these auroral forms, which contains emission in all colours throughout the optical range, and has been observed with various spectrograph instruments.
- Ultraviolet: Ultraviolet radiation from auroras (within the optical window but not visible to the human eye) has been observed with the requisite equipment. Ultraviolet auroras have also been seen on Mars, Jupiter, and Saturn.
- Infrared: Infrared radiation, in wavelengths that are within the optical window, is also part of many auroras.
- Yellow and pink are a mix of red and green or blue. Yellow and pink auroras are relatively rare and are associated with high solar activity. Other shades of red, as well as orange and gold, also may be seen on rare occasions. As red, green, and blue are linearly independent colours, additive synthesis could, in theory, produce most human-perceived colours, but the ones mentioned in this article comprise a virtually exhaustive list.

=== Changes with time ===
Construction of a keogram from one night's recording by an all-sky camera, 6/7 September 2021. Keograms are commonly used to visualize changes in auroras over time.

Auroras change with time. Over the night they begin with glows and progress toward coronas, although they may not reach them. They tend to fade in the opposite order. Until about 1963, it was thought that these changes were due to the rotation of the Earth under a pattern fixed with respect to the Sun. Later, it was found by comparing all-sky films of auroras from different places (collected during the International Geophysical Year) that they often undergo global changes in a process called auroral substorm. They change in a few minutes from quiet arcs all along the auroral oval to active displays along the dark side and after 1–3 hours they gradually change back. Changes in auroras over time are commonly visualized using keograms.

At shorter time scales, auroras can change their appearances and intensity, sometimes so slowly as to be difficult to notice, and at other times rapidly down to the sub-second scale. The phenomenon of pulsating auroras is an example of intensity variations over short timescales, typically with periods of 2–20 seconds. This type of aurora is generally accompanied by decreasing peak emission heights of about 8 km for blue and green emissions and above-average solar wind speeds (c. 500 km/s).

=== Other auroral emissions ===
In addition, the aurora and associated currents produce a strong radio emission around 150 kHz known as auroral kilometric radiation (AKR), discovered in 1972. Ionospheric absorption makes AKR only observable from space. X-ray emissions, originating from the particles associated with auroras, have also been detected.

A crackling noise, begins about 70 m (230 ft) above Earth's surface and is caused by charged particles in an inversion layer of the atmosphere formed during a cold night. The charged particles discharge when particles from the Sun hit the inversion layer, creating the noise.

=== Abnormal types ===
==== STEVE ====
In 2016, more than fifty citizen science observations described what was to them an unknown type of aurora which they named "STEVE", for "Strong Thermal Emission Velocity Enhancement". STEVE is not an aurora but is caused by a 25 km (16 mi) wide ribbon of hot plasma at an altitude of 450 km (280 mi), with a temperature of 3,000 °C (3,270 K; 5,430 °F) and flowing at a speed of 6 km/s (3.7 mi/s) (compared to 10 m/s (33 ft/s) outside the ribbon).

==== Picket-fence aurora ====
The processes that cause STEVE are also associated with a picket-fence aurora, although the latter can be seen without STEVE. It is an aurora because it is caused by the precipitation of electrons in the atmosphere but it appears outside the auroral oval, closer to the equator than typical auroras. When the picket-fence aurora appears with STEVE, it is below.

==== Dune aurora ====
First reported in 2020, and confirmed in 2021, the dune aurora phenomenon was discovered by Finnish citizen scientists. It consists of regularly spaced, parallel stripes of brighter emission in the green diffuse aurora which gives the impression of sand dunes. The phenomenon is believed to be caused by the modulation of atomic oxygen density by a large-scale atmospheric wave travelling horizontally in a waveguide through an inversion layer in the mesosphere in presence of electron precipitation.

==== Fragments of Aurora-like Emission ====
Fragments of Aurora-like Emission (FAEs) are small (only a few kilometres in diameter) bright green optical structures, which can appear either alone or in chain-like formations. FAEs are not driven by particle precipitation but instead researchers believe they are driven by the Farley-Buneman Instability, a local plasma instability in the ionosphere. They are a short-lived phenomenon appearing for typically less than a minute. They were first identified in 2021, with the help of citizen science project AuroraZoo.

==== Horse-collar aurora ====
Horse-collar auroras (HCA) are auroral features in which the auroral ellipse shifts poleward during the dawn and dusk portions and the polar cap becomes teardrop-shaped. They form during periods when the interplanetary magnetic field (IMF) is permanently northward, when the IMF clock angle is small. Their formation is associated with the closure of the magnetic flux at the top of the dayside magnetosphere by the double lobe reconnection (DLR). There are approximately 8 HCA events per month, with no seasonal dependence, and that the IMF must be within 30 degrees of northwards.

==== Conjugate auroras ====
Conjugate auroras are nearly exact mirror-image auroras found at conjugate points in the northern and southern hemispheres on the same geomagnetic field lines. These generally happen at the time of the equinoxes, when there is little difference in the orientation of the north and south geomagnetic poles to the Sun. Attempts were made to image conjugate auroras by aircraft from Alaska and New Zealand in 1967, 1968, 1970, and 1971, with some success.

== Causes ==
A full understanding of the physical processes that lead to different types of auroras is still incomplete, but the basic cause involves the interaction of the solar wind with Earth's magnetosphere. The varying intensity of the solar wind produces effects of different magnitudes but includes one or more of the following physical scenarios.

1. A quiescent solar wind flowing past Earth's magnetosphere steadily interacts with it and can inject solar wind particles directly onto the geomagnetic field lines that are 'open', as opposed to being 'closed' in the opposite hemisphere and provide diffusion through the bow shock. It can also cause particles already trapped in the radiation belts to precipitate into the atmosphere. Once particles are lost to the atmosphere from the radiation belts, under quiet conditions, new ones replace them only slowly, and the loss cone becomes depleted. In the magnetotail, however, particle trajectories seem constantly to reshuffle, probably when the particles cross the very weak magnetic field near the equator. As a result, the flow of electrons in that region is nearly the same in all directions ("isotropic") and assures a steady supply of leaking electrons. The leakage of electrons does not leave the tail positively charged, because each leaked electron lost to the atmosphere is replaced by a low-energy electron drawn upward from the ionosphere. Such replacement of "hot" electrons by "cold" ones is in complete accord with the second law of thermodynamics. The complete process, which also generates an electric ring current around Earth, is uncertain.
2. Geomagnetic disturbance from an enhanced solar wind causes distortions of the magnetotail ("magnetic substorms"). These 'substorms' tend to occur after prolonged spells (on the order of hours) during which the interplanetary magnetic field has had an appreciable southward component. This leads to a higher rate of interconnection between its field lines and those of Earth. As a result, the solar wind moves magnetic flux (tubes of magnetic field lines, 'locked' together with their resident plasma) from the day side of Earth to the magnetotail, widening the obstacle it presents to the solar wind flow and constricting the tail on the night-side. Ultimately some tail plasma can separate ("magnetic reconnection"); some blobs ("plasmoids") are squeezed downstream and are carried away with the solar wind; others are squeezed toward Earth where their motion feeds strong outbursts of auroras, mainly around midnight ("unloading process"). A geomagnetic storm resulting from greater interaction adds many more particles to the plasma trapped around Earth, also producing enhancement of the "ring current". Occasionally the resulting modification of Earth's magnetic field can be so strong that it produces auroras visible at middle latitudes, on field lines much closer to the equator than those of the auroral zone.
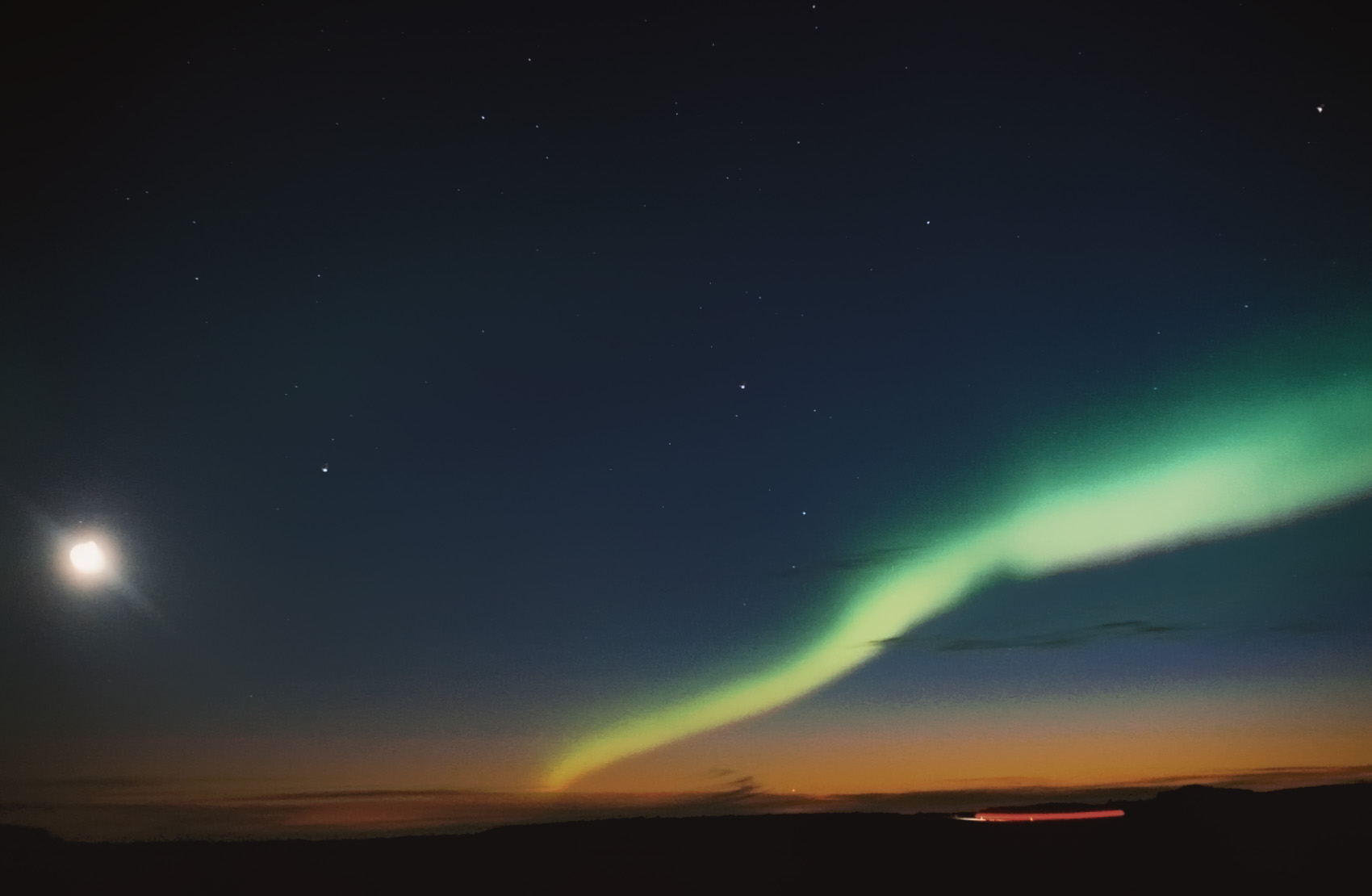
  Moon and aurora
3. Acceleration of auroral charged particles invariably accompanies a magnetospheric disturbance that causes an aurora. This mechanism, which is believed to predominantly arise from strong electric fields along the magnetic field or wave-particle interactions, raises the velocity of a particle in the direction of the guiding magnetic field. The pitch angle is thereby decreased and increases the chance of it being precipitated into the atmosphere. Both electromagnetic and electrostatic waves, produced at the time of greater geomagnetic disturbances, make a significant contribution to the energizing processes that sustain an aurora. Particle acceleration provides a complex intermediate process for transferring energy from the solar wind indirectly into the atmosphere.

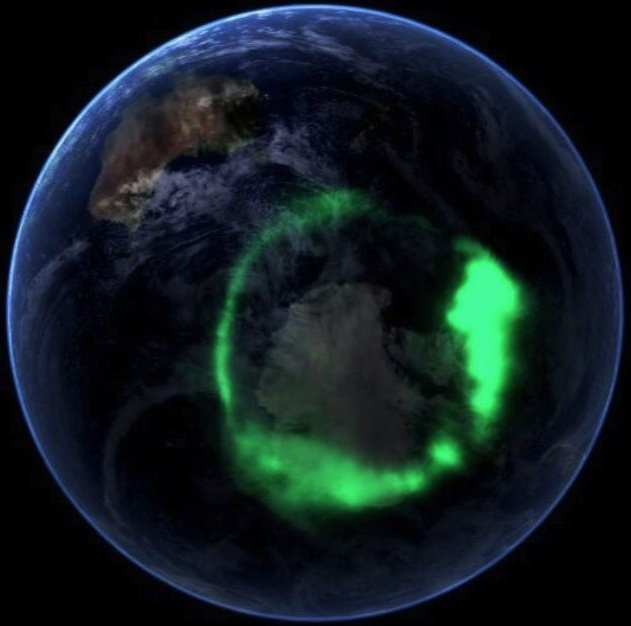
Aurora australis (11 September 2005) as captured by NASA's IMAGE satellite, digitally overlaid onto The Blue Marble composite image. An animation created using the same satellite data is also available.

The details of these phenomena are not fully understood. However, it is clear that the prime source of auroral particles is the solar wind feeding the magnetosphere, the reservoir containing the radiation zones and temporarily magnetically trapped particles confined by the geomagnetic field, coupled with particle acceleration processes.

=== Auroral particles ===
The immediate cause of the ionization and excitation of atmospheric constituents leading to auroral emissions was discovered in 1960, when a pioneering rocket flight from Fort Churchill in Canada revealed a flux of electrons entering the atmosphere from above. Since then an extensive collection of measurements has been acquired painstakingly and with steadily improving resolution since the 1960s by many research teams using rockets and satellites to traverse the auroral zone. The main findings have been that auroral arcs and other bright forms are due to electrons that have been accelerated during the final few 10,000 km or so of their plunge into the atmosphere. These electrons often, but not always, exhibit a peak in their energy distribution, and are preferentially aligned along the local direction of the magnetic field.

Electrons are mainly responsible for diffuse and pulsating auroras have, in contrast, a smoothly falling energy distribution, and an angular (pitch-angle) distribution favouring directions perpendicular to the local magnetic field. Pulsations were discovered to originate at or close to the equatorial crossing point of auroral zone magnetic field lines. Protons are also associated with auroras, both discrete and diffuse.

=== Auroral particle acceleration ===
Just as there are many types of aurora, there are many different mechanisms that accelerate auroral particles into the atmosphere. Electron aurora in Earth's auroral zone (i.e. commonly visible aurora) can be split into two main categories with different immediate causes: diffuse and discrete aurora. Diffuse aurora appear relatively structureless to an observer on the ground, with indistinct edges and amorphous forms. Discrete aurora are structured into distinct features with well-defined edges such as arcs, rays, and coronas; they also tend to be much brighter than diffuse aurora.

In both cases, the electrons that eventually cause the aurora start out as electrons trapped by the magnetic field in Earth's magnetosphere. These trapped particles bounce back and forth along magnetic field lines and are prevented from hitting the atmosphere by the magnetic mirror formed by the increasing magnetic field strength closer to Earth. The magnetic mirror's ability to trap a particle depends on the particle's pitch angle: the angle between its direction of motion and the local magnetic field. An aurora is created by processes that decrease the pitch angle of many individual electrons, freeing them from the magnetic trap and causing them to hit the atmosphere.

In the case of diffuse auroras, the electron pitch angles are altered by their interaction with various plasma waves. Each interaction is essentially wave-particle scattering; the electron energy after interacting with the wave is similar to its energy before interaction, but the direction of motion is altered. If the final direction of motion after scattering is close to the field line (specifically, if it falls within the loss cone) then the electron will hit the atmosphere. Diffuse auroras are caused by the collective effect of many such scattered electrons hitting the atmosphere. The process is mediated by the plasma waves, which become stronger during periods of high geomagnetic activity, leading to increased diffuse aurora at those times.

In the case of discrete auroras, the trapped electrons are accelerated toward Earth by electric fields that form at an altitude of about 4000–12000 km in the "auroral acceleration region". The electric fields point away from Earth (i.e. upward) along the magnetic field line. Electrons moving downward through these fields gain a substantial amount of energy (on the order of a few keV) in the direction along the magnetic field line toward Earth. This field-aligned acceleration decreases the pitch angle for all of the electrons passing through the region, causing many of them to hit the upper atmosphere. In contrast to the scattering process leading to diffuse auroras, the electric field increases the kinetic energy of all of the electrons transiting downward through the acceleration region by the same amount. This accelerates electrons starting from the magnetosphere with initially low energies (tens of eV or less) to energies required to create an aurora (100s of eV or greater), allowing that large source of particles to contribute to creating auroral light.

The accelerated electrons carry an electric current along the magnetic field lines (a Birkeland current). Since the electric field points in the same direction as the current, there is a net conversion of electromagnetic energy into particle energy in the auroral acceleration region (an electric load). The energy to power this load is eventually supplied by the magnetized solar wind flowing around the obstacle of Earth's magnetic field, although exactly how that power flows through the magnetosphere is still an active area of research. While the energy to power the aurora is ultimately derived from the solar wind, the electrons themselves do not travel directly from the solar wind into Earth's auroral zone; magnetic field lines from these regions do not connect to the solar wind, so there is no direct access for solar wind electrons.

Some auroral features are also created by electrons accelerated by dispersive Alfvén waves. At small wavelengths, transverse to the background magnetic field (comparable to the electron inertial length or ion gyroradius), Alfvén waves develop a significant electric field parallel to the background magnetic field. This electric field can accelerate electrons to keV energies, sufficient to produce auroral arcs. If the electrons have a speed close to that of the wave's phase velocity, they are accelerated in a manner analogous to a surfer catching an ocean wave. This constantly changing wave electric field can accelerate electrons along the field line, causing some of them to hit the atmosphere. Electrons accelerated by this mechanism tend to have a broad energy spectrum, in contrast to the sharply peaked energy spectrum typical of electrons accelerated by quasi-static electric fields.

In addition to the discrete and diffuse electron aurora, proton aurora is caused when magnetospheric protons collide with the upper atmosphere. The proton gains an electron in the interaction, and the resulting neutral hydrogen atom emits photons. The resulting light is too dim to be seen with the naked eye. Other aurora not covered by the above discussion include transpolar arcs (formed poleward of the auroral zone), cusp aurora (formed in two small high-latitude areas on the dayside), and some non-terrestrial auroras.

=== Atmosphere ===
Auroras result from emissions of photons in Earth's upper atmosphere, above 80 km (50 mi), from ionized nitrogen atoms regaining an electron, and oxygen atoms and nitrogen-based molecules returning from an excited state to the ground state. They are ionized or excited by the collision of particles precipitated into the atmosphere. Both incoming electrons and protons may be involved. Excitation energy is lost within the atmosphere by the emission of a photon, or by collision with another atom or molecule:

Oxygen emissions
green or orange-red, depending on the amount of energy absorbed.
Nitrogen emissions
blue, purple, or red; blue and purple if the molecule regains an electron after it has been ionized, red if returning to ground state from an excited state.

Oxygen is unusual in terms of its return to ground state: it can take 0.7 seconds to emit the 557.7 nm green light and up to two minutes for the red 630.0 nm emission. Collisions with other atoms or molecules absorb the excitation energy and prevent emission; this process is called collisional quenching. Because the highest parts of the atmosphere contain a higher percentage of oxygen and lower particle densities, such collisions are rare enough to allow time for oxygen to emit red light. Collisions become more frequent progressing down into the atmosphere due to increasing density, so red emissions do not have time to happen, and eventually, even green light emissions are prevented.

The change in auroral colour with altitude is therefore explained—oxygen red is predominant at high altitudes, followed by oxygen green and nitrogen blue/purple/red, then finally other hues of nitrogen blue/purple/red where particle collisions prevent oxygen from emissions. Green is the most common colour. Then comes pink, a mixture of light green and red, followed by pure red, then yellow (a mixture of red and green), and finally, pure blue.

Precipitating protons generally produce optical emissions as incident hydrogen atoms after gaining electrons from the atmosphere. Proton auroras are usually observed at lower latitudes.

=== Ionosphere ===
Bright auroras are generally associated with Birkeland currents (Schield et al., 1969; Zmuda and Armstrong, 1973), which flow down into the ionosphere on one side of the pole and out on the other. In between, some of the current connects directly through the ionospheric E layer (125 km); the rest ("region 2") detours, leaving again through field lines closer to the equator and closing through the "partial ring current" carried by magnetically trapped plasma. The ionosphere is an ohmic conductor, so some consider that such currents require a driving voltage, which an, as yet unspecified, dynamo mechanism can supply. Electric field probes in orbit above the polar cap suggest voltages of the order of 40,000 volts, rising up to more than 200,000 volts during intense magnetic storms. In another interpretation, the currents are the direct result of electron acceleration into the atmosphere by wave/particle interactions.

Ionospheric resistance has a complex nature and leads to a secondary Hall current flow. Due to physics, the magnetic disturbance on the ground due to the main current almost cancels out, so most of the observed effect of auroras is due to a secondary current, the auroral electrojet. An auroral electrojet index (measured in nanotesla) is regularly derived from ground data and serves as a general measure of auroral activity. Kristian Birkeland deduced that the currents flowed in the east–west directions along the auroral arc, and such currents, flowing from the dayside toward (approximately) midnight were later named "auroral electrojets" (see also Birkeland currents). The ionosphere can contribute to the formation of auroral arcs via the feedback instability under high ionospheric resistance conditions, observed at night time and in the dark Winter hemisphere.

== Interaction of the solar wind with Earth ==
Earth is constantly immersed in the solar wind, a flow of magnetized hot plasma (a gas of free electrons and positive ions) emitted by the Sun in all directions, a result of the two-million-degree temperature of the Sun's outermost layer, the corona. The solar wind reaches Earth with a velocity typically around 400 km/s, a density of around 5 ions/cm^{3}, and a magnetic field intensity of around 2–5 nT (for comparison, Earth's surface field is typically 30,000–50,000 nT). During magnetic storms, in particular, flows can be several times faster; the interplanetary magnetic field (IMF) may also be much stronger. Joan Feynman deduced in the 1970s that the long-term averages of solar wind speed correlated with geomagnetic activity. Her work resulted from data collected by the Explorer 33 spacecraft.

The solar wind and magnetosphere consist of plasma (ionized gas), which conducts electricity. It is well known (since Michael Faraday's work around 1830) that when an electrical conductor is placed within a magnetic field while relative motion occurs in a direction that the conductor cuts across (or is cut by), rather than along, the lines of the magnetic field, an electric current is induced within the conductor. The strength of the current depends on a) the rate of relative motion, b) the strength of the magnetic field, c) the number of conductors ganged together, and d) the distance between the conductor and the magnetic field, while the direction of flow is dependent upon the direction of relative motion. Dynamos make use of this basic process ("the dynamo effect"), any and all conductors, solid or otherwise are so affected, including plasmas and other fluids.

The IMF originates on the Sun, linked to the sunspots, and its field lines (lines of force) are dragged out by the solar wind. That alone would tend to line them up in the Sun-Earth direction, but the rotation of the Sun angles them at Earth by about 45 degrees forming a spiral in the ecliptic plane, known as the Parker spiral. The field lines passing Earth are therefore usually linked to those near the western edge ("limb") of the visible Sun at any time.

The solar wind and the magnetosphere, being two electrically conducting fluids in relative motion, should be able in principle to generate electric currents by dynamo action and impart energy from the flow of the solar wind. However, this process is hampered by the fact that plasmas conduct readily along magnetic field lines, but less readily perpendicular to them. Energy is more effectively transferred by the temporary magnetic connection between the field lines of the solar wind and those of the magnetosphere. Unsurprisingly this process is known as magnetic reconnection. As already mentioned, it happens most readily when the interplanetary field is directed southward, in a similar direction to the geomagnetic field in the inner regions of both the north magnetic pole and south magnetic pole.

Auroras are more frequent and brighter during the intense phase of the solar cycle when coronal mass ejections increase the intensity of the solar wind.

=== Magnetosphere ===
Schematic of Earth's magnetosphere

Earth's magnetosphere is shaped by the impact of the solar wind on Earth's magnetic field. This forms an obstacle to the flow, diverting it, at an average distance of about 70,000 km (11 Earth radii or R_{e}), producing a bow shock 12,000 km to 15,000 km (1.9 to 2.4 R_{e}) further upstream. The width of the magnetosphere abreast of Earth is typically 190,000 km (30 R_{e}), and on the night side, a long "magnetotail" of stretched field lines extends to great distances (> 200 R_{e}).

The high-latitude magnetosphere is filled with plasma as the solar wind passes Earth. The flow of plasma into the magnetosphere increases with additional turbulence, density, and speed in the solar wind. This flow is favoured by a southward component of the IMF, which can then directly connect to the high latitude geomagnetic field lines. The flow pattern of magnetospheric plasma is mainly from the magnetotail toward Earth, around Earth and back into the solar wind through the magnetopause on the day-side. In addition to moving perpendicular to Earth's magnetic field, some magnetospheric plasma travels down along Earth's magnetic field lines, gains additional energy and loses it to the atmosphere in the auroral zones. The cusps of the magnetosphere, separating geomagnetic field lines that close through Earth from those that close remotely allow a small amount of solar wind to directly reach the top of the atmosphere, producing an auroral glow.

On 26 February 2008, THEMIS probes were able to determine, for the first time, the triggering event for the onset of magnetospheric substorms. Two of the five probes, positioned approximately one-third the distance to the Moon, measured events suggesting a magnetic reconnection event 96 seconds prior to auroral intensification.

Geomagnetic storms that ignite auroras may occur more often during the months around the equinoxes. It is not well understood, but geomagnetic storms may vary with Earth's seasons. Two factors to consider are the tilt of both the solar and Earth's axis to the ecliptic plane. As Earth orbits throughout the year, it experiences an interplanetary magnetic field (IMF) from different latitudes of the Sun, which is tilted at 8 degrees. Similarly, the 23-degree tilt of Earth's axis about which the geomagnetic pole rotates with a diurnal variation changes the daily average angle that the geomagnetic field presents to the incident IMF throughout the year. These factors combined can lead to minor cyclical changes in the detailed way that the IMF links to the magnetosphere. In turn, this affects which energy from the solar wind can reach Earth's inner magnetosphere and thereby enhance auroras. Recent evidence in 2021 has shown that individual separate substorms may in fact be correlated networked communities.

== Extraterrestrial auroras ==
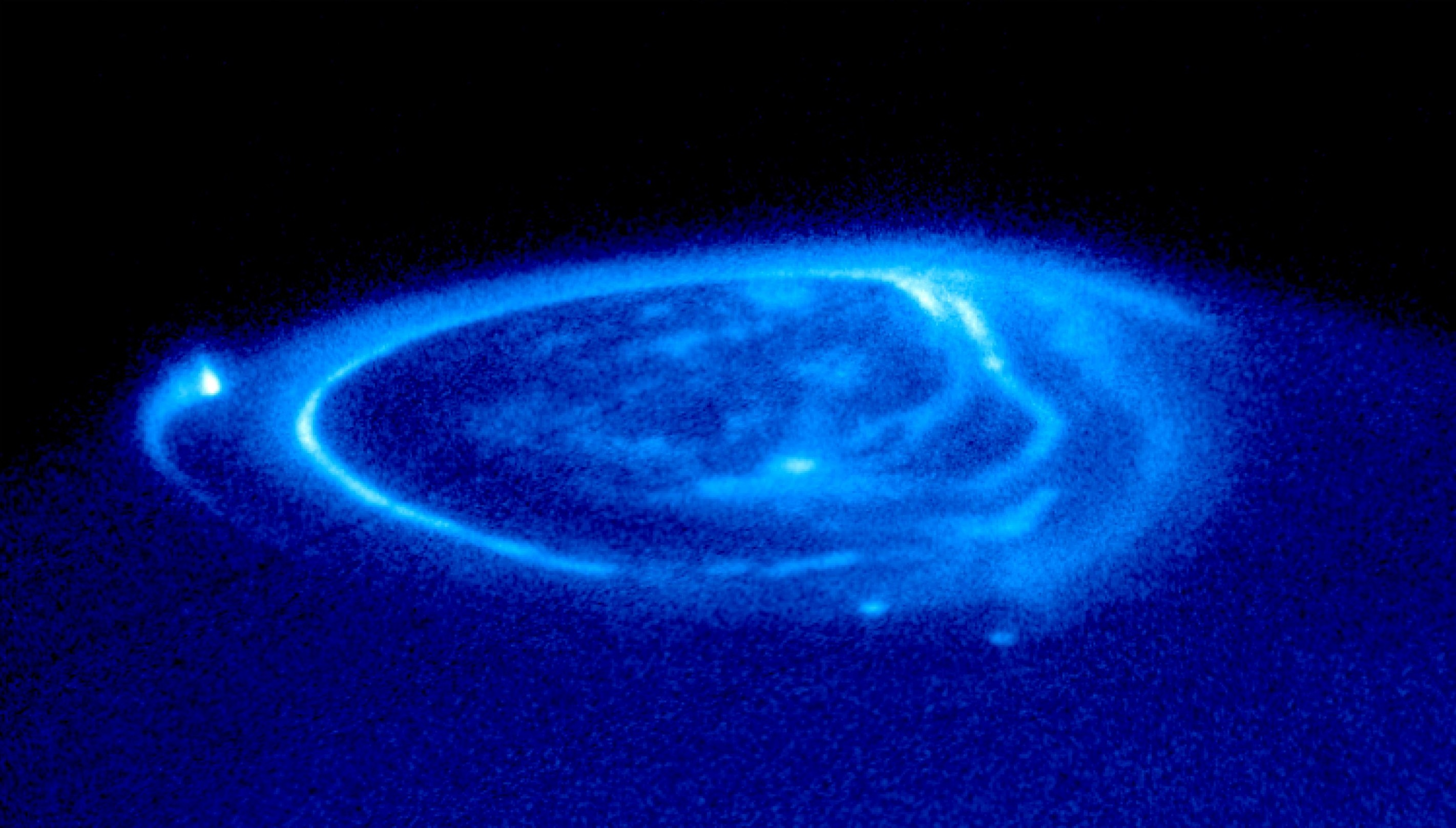
Jupiter aurora; the far left bright spot connects magnetically to Io; the spots at the bottom of the image lead to Ganymede and Europa.

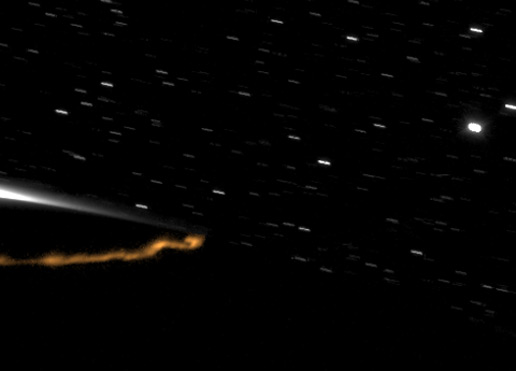
An aurora high above the northern part of Saturn; image taken by the Cassini spacecraft. A movie shows images from 81 hours of observations of Saturn's aurora.

Aurora have been observed on all planets with magnetic fields; the physical mechanism is the same but the consequences can be quite different.

Both Jupiter and Saturn have magnetic fields that are stronger than Earth's (Jupiter's equatorial field strength is 4.3 gauss, compared to 0.3 gauss for Earth), and both have extensive radiation belts. Auroras have been observed on both gas planets, most clearly using the Hubble Space Telescope, and the Cassini and Galileo spacecraft, as well as on Uranus and Neptune.

The auroras on Saturn seem, like Earth's, to be powered by the solar wind. However, Jupiter's auroras are more complex. Jupiter's main auroral oval is associated with the plasma produced by the volcanic moon Io, and the transport of this plasma within the planet's magnetosphere. An uncertain fraction of Jupiter's auroras are powered by the solar wind. In addition, the moons, especially Io, are also powerful sources of aurora. These arise from electric currents along field lines ("field aligned currents"), generated by a dynamo mechanism due to the relative motion between the rotating planet and the moving moon. Io, which has active volcanism and an ionosphere, is a particularly strong source, and its currents also generate radio emissions, which have been studied since 1955. Using the Hubble Space Telescope, auroras over Io, Europa, and Ganymede have all been observed.

Auroras have also been observed on Venus and Mars. Venus has no magnetic field so Venusian auroras appear as bright and diffuse patches of varying shape and intensity, sometimes distributed over the full disc of the planet. A Venusian aurora originates when electrons from the solar wind collide with the night-side atmosphere.

An aurora was detected on Mars, on 14 August 2004, by the SPICAM instrument aboard Mars Express. The aurora was located at Terra Cimmeria, in the region of 177° east, 52° south. The total size of the emission region was about 30 km across, and possibly about 8 km high. By analyzing a map of crustal magnetic anomalies compiled with data from the Mars Global Surveyor, scientists observed that the region of the emissions corresponded to an area where the strongest magnetic field is localized. This correlation indicated that the origin of the light emission was a flux of electrons moving along the crust magnetic lines and exciting the upper atmosphere of Mars.

X-ray auroras have been observed occurring on Mercury by the Mariner 10 and MESSENGER missions, however, due to Mercury's incredibly thin exosphere, these emissions occur on its surface, rather than its atmosphere. In 2023, the BepiColombo mission observed electromagnetic waves generating within 1200 km of Mercury's surface, scattering electrons believed to generate the X-ray aurora.

Between 2014 and 2016, cometary auroras were observed on comet 67P/Churyumov–Gerasimenko by multiple instruments on the Rosetta spacecraft. The auroras were observed at far-ultraviolet wavelengths. Coma observations revealed atomic emissions of hydrogen and oxygen caused by the photodissociation (not photoionization, like in terrestrial auroras) of water molecules in the comet's coma. The interaction of accelerated electrons from the solar wind with gas particles in the coma is responsible for the aurora. Since comet 67P has no magnetic field, the aurora is diffusely spread around the comet.

Exoplanets, such as hot Jupiters, have been suggested to experience ionization in their upper atmospheres and generate an aurora modified by weather in their turbulent tropospheres. However, there is no current detection of an exoplanet aurora.

The first ever extra-solar auroras were discovered in July 2015 over the brown dwarf star LSR J1835+3259. The mainly red aurora was found to be a million times brighter than the northern lights, a result of the charged particles interacting with hydrogen in the atmosphere. It has been speculated that stellar winds may be stripping off material from the surface of the brown dwarf to produce their own electrons. Another possible explanation for the auroras is that an as-yet-undetected body around the dwarf star is throwing off material, as is the case with Jupiter and its moon Io.

== Historically significant events ==
The discovery of a 1770 Japanese diary in 2017 depicting auroras above the ancient Japanese capital of Kyoto suggested that the storm may have been 7% larger than the Carrington Event, which affected telegraph networks.

The auroras that resulted from the Carrington Event on both 28 August and 2 September 1859, are thought to be the most spectacular in recent history. In a paper to the Royal Society on 21 November 1861, Balfour Stewart described both auroral events as documented by a self-recording magnetograph at the Kew Observatory and established the connection between the 2 September 1859 auroral storm and the Carrington–Hodgson flare event when he observed that "It is not impossible to suppose that in this case our luminary was taken in the act." The second auroral event, which occurred on 2 September 1859, was a result of the (unseen) coronal mass ejection associated with the exceptionally intense Carrington–Hodgson white light solar flare on 1 September 1859. This event produced auroras so widespread and extraordinarily bright that they were seen and reported in published scientific measurements, ship logs, and newspapers throughout the United States, Europe, Japan, and Australia. It was reported by The New York Times that in Boston on Friday 2 September 1859, the aurora was "so brilliant that at about one o'clock ordinary print could be read by the light". One o'clock EST time on Friday 2 September would have been 6:00 GMT; the self-recording magnetograph at the Kew Observatory was recording the geomagnetic storm, which was then one hour old, at its full intensity. Between 1859 and 1862, Elias Loomis published a series of nine papers on the Great Auroral Exhibition of 1859 in the American Journal of Science where he collected worldwide reports of the auroral event.

That aurora is thought to have been produced by one of the most intense coronal mass ejections in history. It is also notable for the fact that it is the first time that the phenomena of auroral activity and electricity were unambiguously linked. This insight was made possible not only due to scientific magnetometer measurements of the era but also as a result of a significant portion of the 125,000 miles (201,000 km) of telegraph lines then in service being significantly disrupted for many hours throughout the storm. Some telegraph lines, however, seem to have been of the appropriate length and orientation to produce a sufficient geomagnetically induced current from the electromagnetic field to allow for continued communication with the telegraph operator power supplies switched off. The following conversation occurred between two operators of the American Telegraph Line between Boston and Portland, Maine, on the night of 2 September 1859 and reported in the Boston Traveller:

Boston operator (to Portland operator): "Please cut off your battery [power source] entirely for fifteen minutes."
Portland operator: "Will do so. It is now disconnected."
Boston: "Mine is disconnected, and we are working with the auroral current. How do you receive my writing?"
Portland: "Better than with our batteries on. – Current comes and goes gradually."
Boston: "My current is very strong at times, and we can work better without the batteries, as the aurora seems to neutralize and augment our batteries alternately, making current too strong at times for our relay magnets. Suppose we work without batteries while we are affected by this trouble."
Portland: "Very well. Shall I go ahead with business?"
Boston: "Yes. Go ahead."

The conversation was carried on for around two hours using no battery power at all and working solely with the current induced by the aurora, and it was said that this was the first time on record that more than a word or two was transmitted in such manner. Such events led to the general conclusion that

The effect of the Aurora on the electric telegraph is generally to increase or diminish the electric current generated in working the wires. Sometimes it entirely neutralizes them, so that, in effect, no fluid [current] is discoverable in them. The aurora borealis seems to be composed of a mass of electric matter, resembling in every respect, that generated by the electric galvanic battery. The currents from it change coming on the wires, and then disappear: the mass of the aurora rolls from the horizon to the zenith.

In May 2024, a series of solar storms caused the aurora borealis to be observed from as far south as Ferdows, Iran.

== Historical views and folklore ==
The earliest datable record of an aurora was recorded in the Bamboo Annals, a historical chronicle of the history of ancient China, in 977 or 957 BC. An aurora was described by the Greek explorer Pytheas in the 4th century BC. Seneca wrote about auroras in the first book of his Naturales Quaestiones, classifying them, for instance, as pithaei ('barrel-like'); chasmata ('chasm'); pogoniae ('bearded'); cyparissae ('like cypress trees'); and describing their manifold colours. He wrote about whether they were above or below the clouds and recalled that under Tiberius, an aurora formed above the port city of Ostia that was so intense and red that a cohort of the army, stationed nearby for fire duty, galloped to the rescue. It has been suggested that Pliny the Elder depicted the aurora borealis in his Natural History when he refers to trabes, chasma, "falling red flames", and "daylight in the night".

The earliest depiction of the aurora may have been in Cro-Magnon cave paintings of northern Spain dating to 30,000 BC.

The oldest known written record of the wintertime aurora was in a Chinese legend written around 2600 BC; an autumnal aurora is recorded centuries later, around 2000 BC.

In Japanese folklore, pheasants were considered messengers from heaven. However, researchers from Japan's Graduate University for Advanced Studies and the National Institute of Polar Research claimed in March 2020 that "red pheasant tails" witnessed across the nightsky over Japan in 620 A.D. might have been instead a red aurora produced during a magnetic storm.

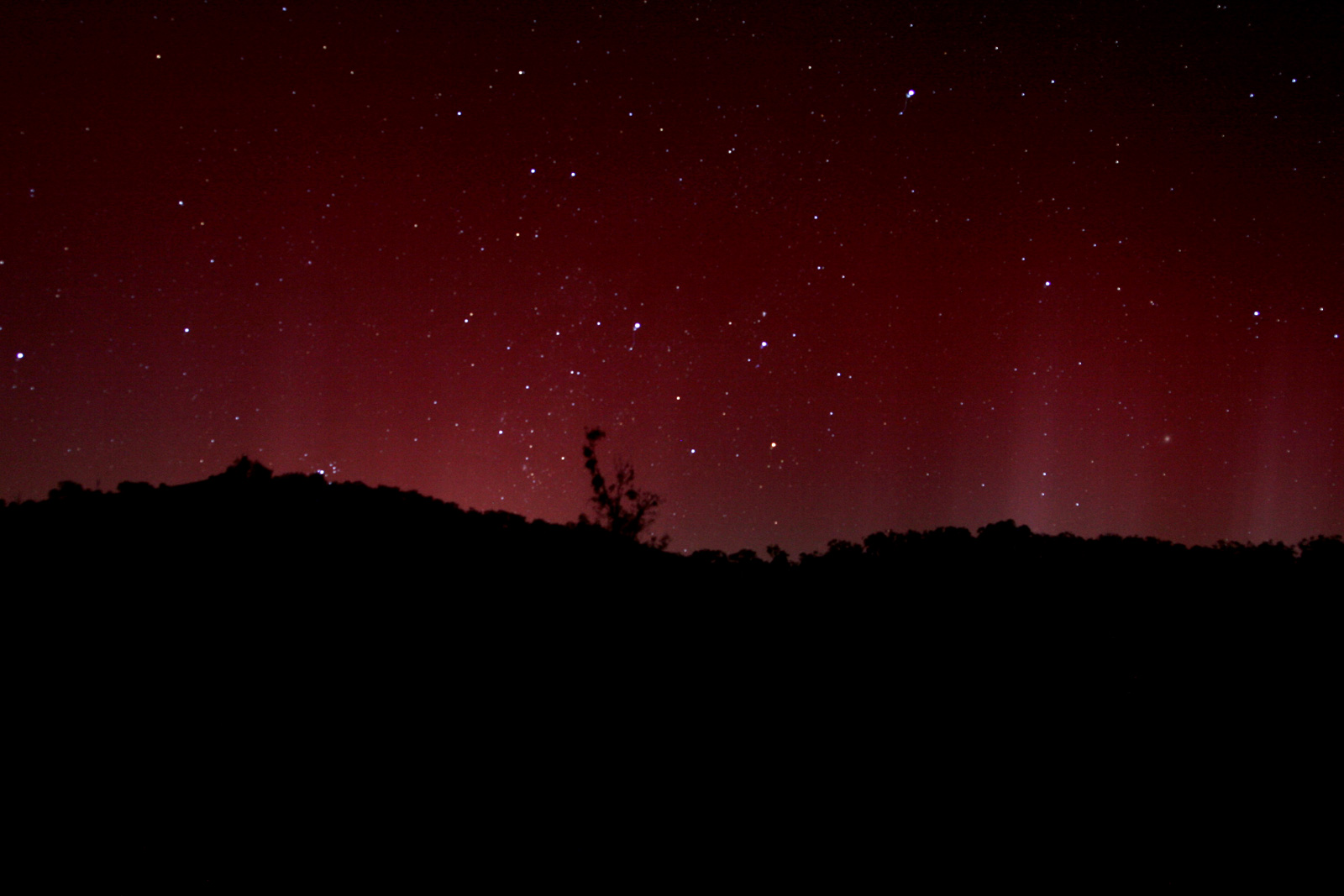
The Aboriginal Australians associated auroras (which are mainly low on the horizon and predominantly red) with fire.

In the traditions of Aboriginal Australians, the aurora australis is commonly associated with fire. For example, the Gunditjmara people of western Victoria called auroras puae buae ('ashes'), while the Gunai people of eastern Victoria perceived auroras as bushfires in the spirit world. The Dieri people of South Australia say that an auroral display is kootchee, an evil spirit creating a large fire. Similarly, the Ngarrindjeri people of South Australia refer to auroras seen over Kangaroo Island as the campfires of spirits in the 'Land of the Dead'. The Dieri and Ngarrindjeri communities in southwest Queensland believe the auroras to be the fires of the Oola Pikka, ghostly spirits who spoke to the people through auroras. Sacred law forbade anyone except male elders from watching or interpreting the messages of ancestors they believed were transmitted through an aurora.

Among the Māori people of New Zealand, aurora australis or Tahunui-a-rangi ("great torches in the sky") were lit by ancestors who sailed south to a "land of ice" (or their descendants); these people were said to be Ui-te-Rangiora's expedition party who had reached the Southern Ocean. around the 7th century.

Aurora is pictured as a wreath of rays in the coat of arms of Utsjoki.

In Scandinavia, the first mention of norðrljós (the northern lights) is found in the Norwegian chronicle Konungs Skuggsjá from AD 1230. The chronicler has heard about this phenomenon from compatriots returning from Greenland, and he gives three possible explanations: that the ocean was surrounded by vast fires; that the sun flares could reach around the world to its night side; or that glaciers could store energy so that they eventually became fluorescent.

Walter William Bryant wrote in his book Kepler (1920) that Tycho Brahe "seems to have been something of a homœopathist, for he recommends sulphur to cure infectious diseases 'brought on by the sulphurous vapours of the Aurora Borealis'".

In 1778, Benjamin Franklin theorized in his paper Aurora Borealis, Suppositions and Conjectures towards forming a Hypothesis for its Explanation that an aurora was caused by a concentration of electrical charge in the polar regions intensified by the snow and moisture in the air:

May not then the great quantity of electricity brought into the polar regions by the clouds, which are condensed there, and fall in the snow, which electricity would enter the earth, but cannot penetrate the ice; may it not, I say (as a bottle overcharged) break thro' that low atmosphere and run along in the vacuum over the air towards the equator, diverging as the degrees of longitude enlarge, strongly visible where densest, and becoming less visible as it more diverges; till it finds a passage to the earth in more temperate climates, or is mingled with the upper air?

Observations of the rhythmic movement of compass needles due to the influence of an aurora were confirmed in the Swedish city of Uppsala by Anders Celsius and Olof Hiorter. In 1741, Hiorter was able to link large magnetic fluctuation to the observation of an aurora overhead. This evidence helped to support their theory that 'magnetic storms' are responsible for such compass fluctuations.

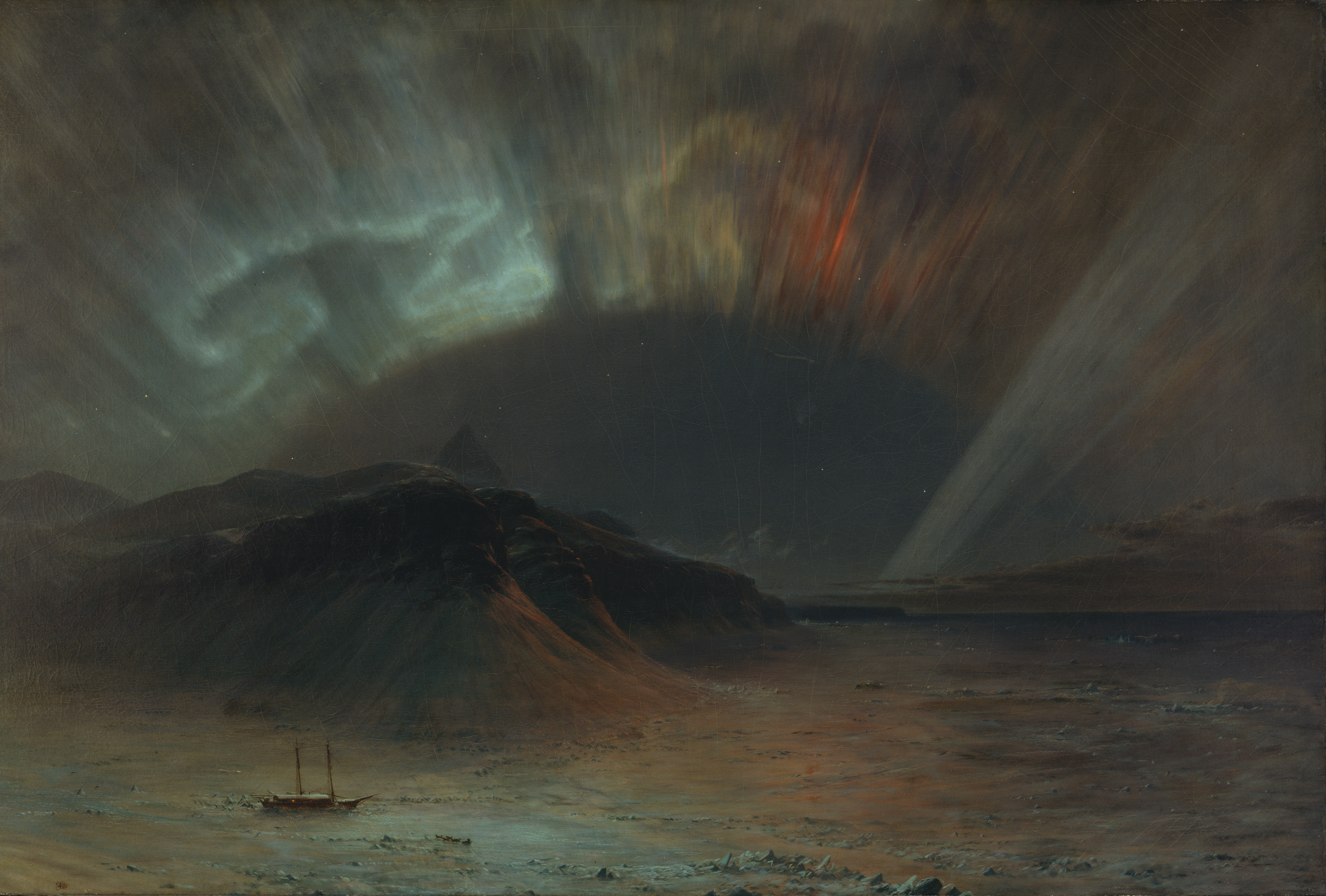
Frederic Edwin Church's 1865 painting Aurora Borealis

A variety of Native American myths surround the spectacle. The European explorer Samuel Hearne travelled with Chipewyan Dene in 1771 and recorded their views on the ed-thin ('caribou'). According to Hearne, the Dene people saw the resemblance between an aurora and the sparks produced when caribou fur is stroked. They believed that the lights were the spirits of their departed friends dancing in the sky, and when they shone brightly it meant that their deceased friends were very happy.

During the night after the Battle of Fredericksburg, an aurora was seen from the battlefield. The Confederate Army took this as a sign that God was on their side, as the lights were rarely seen so far south. The painting Aurora Borealis by Frederic Edwin Church is widely interpreted to represent the conflict of the American Civil War.

A mid-19th-century British source says auroras were a rare occurrence before the 18th century. It quotes Halley as saying that before the aurora of 1716, no such phenomenon had been recorded for more than 80 years, and none of any consequence since 1574. It says no appearance is recorded in the Transactions of the French Academy of Sciences between 1666 and 1716; and that one aurora recorded in Berlin Miscellany for 1797 was called a very rare event. One observed in 1723 at Bologna was stated to be the first ever seen there. Celsius (1733) states the oldest residents of Uppsala thought the phenomenon a great rarity before 1716. The period between approximately 1645 and 1715 corresponds to the Maunder minimum in sunspot activity.

In Robert W. Service's satirical poem "The Ballad of the Northern Lights" (1908), a Yukon prospector discovers that the aurora is the glow from a radium mine. He stakes his claim, then goes to town looking for investors.

In the early 1900s, the Norwegian scientist Kristian Birkeland developed a theory foundational to the current understanding of geomagnetism and polar auroras.

In Sami mythology, the northern lights are caused by the deceased who bled to death cutting themselves, their blood spilling on the sky. Many aboriginal peoples of northern Eurasia and North America share similar beliefs of northern lights being the blood of the deceased, some believing they are caused by dead warriors' blood spraying on the sky as they engage in playing games, riding horses, or having fun in some other way.

== See also ==
- Airglow – Faint emission of light by a planetary atmosphere
- Aurora (heraldry) – Heraldic charge
- Heliophysics – Science of the heliosphere
- List of solar storms
- Paschen's law – Physical law about electrical discharge in gases
- Space tornado – Solar windstorm
- Space weather – Branch of space physics and aeronomy
