= Superposed epoch analysis =

Superposed epoch analysis (SPE or SEA), also called Chree analysis after a paper by Charles Chree that employed the technique, is a statistical tool used in data analysis to detect patterns in time series relative to specific epochs or events or to reveal a correlation (usually in time) between two data sequences (usually two time series).

When comparing two time series, the essence of the method is to: (1) define each occurrence of an event in one data sequence (series #1) as a key time; (2) extract subsets of data from the other sequence (series #2) within some time range near each key time; (3) superpose all extracted subsets from series #2 (with key times for all subsets synchronized) by adding them. (To effectively superpose data from series #2 that are recorded at different or even irregular times, data binning is often used.) This approach can be used to detect a signal (i.e., related variations in both series) in the presence of noise (i.e., unrelated variations in both series) whenever the noise sums incoherently while the signal is reinforced by the superposition.

To search for periodicities in a single time series, the data sequence can be broken into separate subsets of equal duration, and then all subsets can be superposed. Some hypothesis for the length of the period is required to set the subsets' duration.

The approach has been used in signal analysis in several fields, including geophysics (where it has been referred to as compositing) and solar physics.
