= Heinrich Caro =

German chemist (1834–1910)

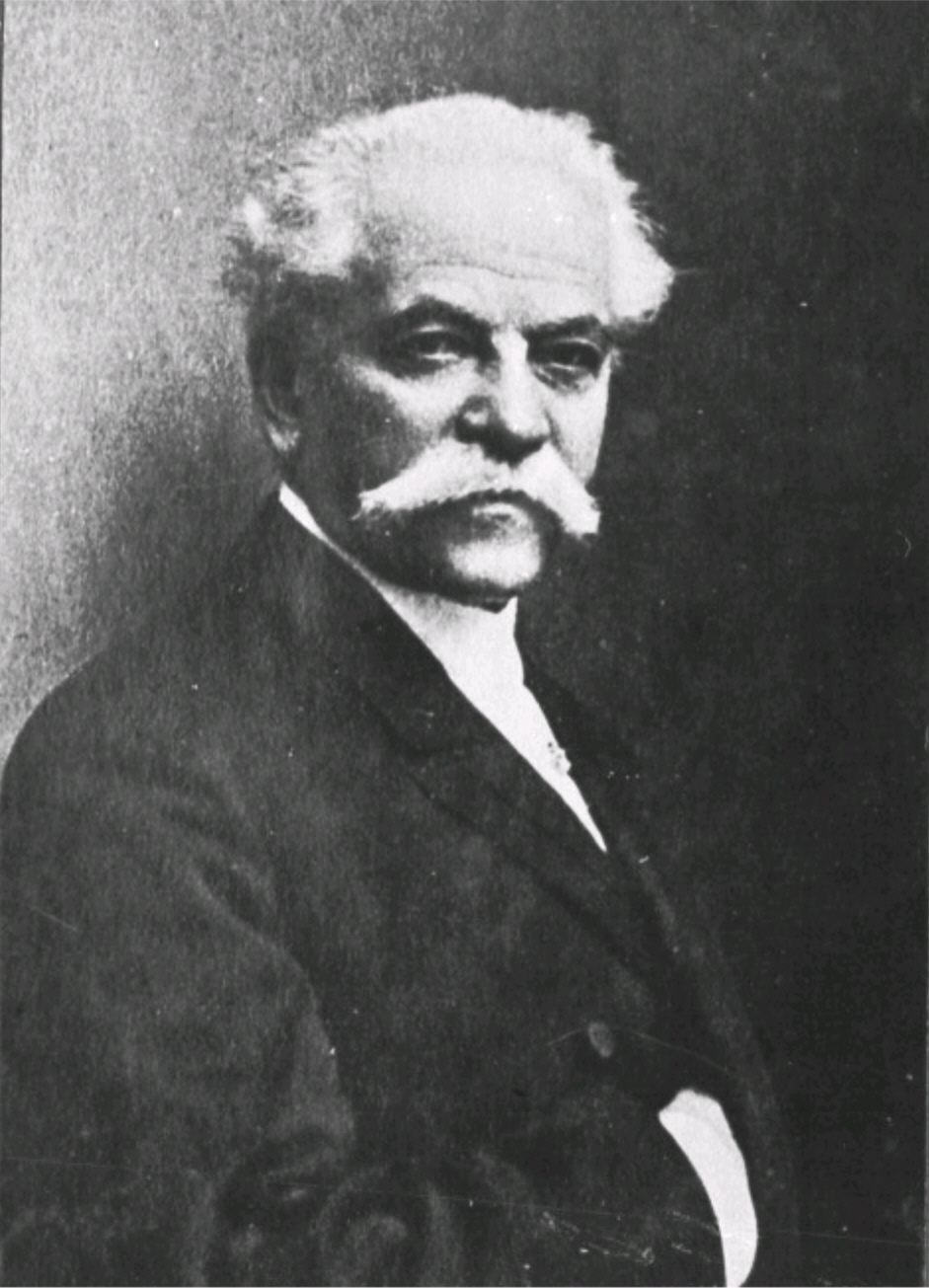
- Heinrich Caro
- Born: February 13, 1834; Posen, Prussia, now Poznań, Poland
- Died: September 11, 1910 (aged 76); Dresden, German Empire
- Education: University of Göttingen, (1888)
- Known for: Erlenmeyer azlactone synthesis Invention of eosin cell stain
- Scientific career
- Workplaces: University of Strasbourg, kaiserliche biologische Anstallt Dahlem

Heinrich Caro (February 13, 1834 – September 11, 1910) was a German chemist. He was the first to isolate acridine and "Caro's acid" (peroxymonosulfuric acid) is named after him. He and Adolf von Baeyer synthesised the first Indigo dye in 1878.

Caro was of Sephardic Jewish origin. He started his study of chemistry at the Friedrich Wilhelms University and later chemistry and dyeing in Berlin at the Royal Trades Institute. On the initiative of Nicolaus Druckenmüller, he trained as a calico printer in Germany, worked at Troost's calico printing works in Mülheim and then worked at the chemical firm of T Roberts and John Dale (Chemist) in Manchester. During this time he improved the analysis of madder lake. After he returned to Germany he conducted his military service in 1857 and 1858. He worked in the laboratory of Jacques Meyer the father of Viktor Meyer in Berlin. In 1858 he was able to return to Mühlheim where he was not able to conduct his work. He joined the chemical firm Roberts and Dale in Manchester for 7 years (1859-1866) which he knew from his former visit. During his time in England he improved the extraction of Mauveine from the residues of the synthesis and developed a synthesis for aniline red and other dyes. In 1861 Caro returned to Germany and stayed at the laboratory of Robert Bunsen until he joined the Chemische Fabrik Dyckerhoff Clemm & Co. This chemical company later became BASF.

Caro was responsible for indigo research at BASF and he and Adolf von Baeyer synthesised the first indigo dye in 1878. Caro also patented the dye alizarin on behalf of BASF. He was the first to isolate acridine and "Caro's acid" (peroxymonosulfuric acid) is named after him. At BASF, Caro discovered eosin in 1874 and first synthesized methylene blue in 1876.

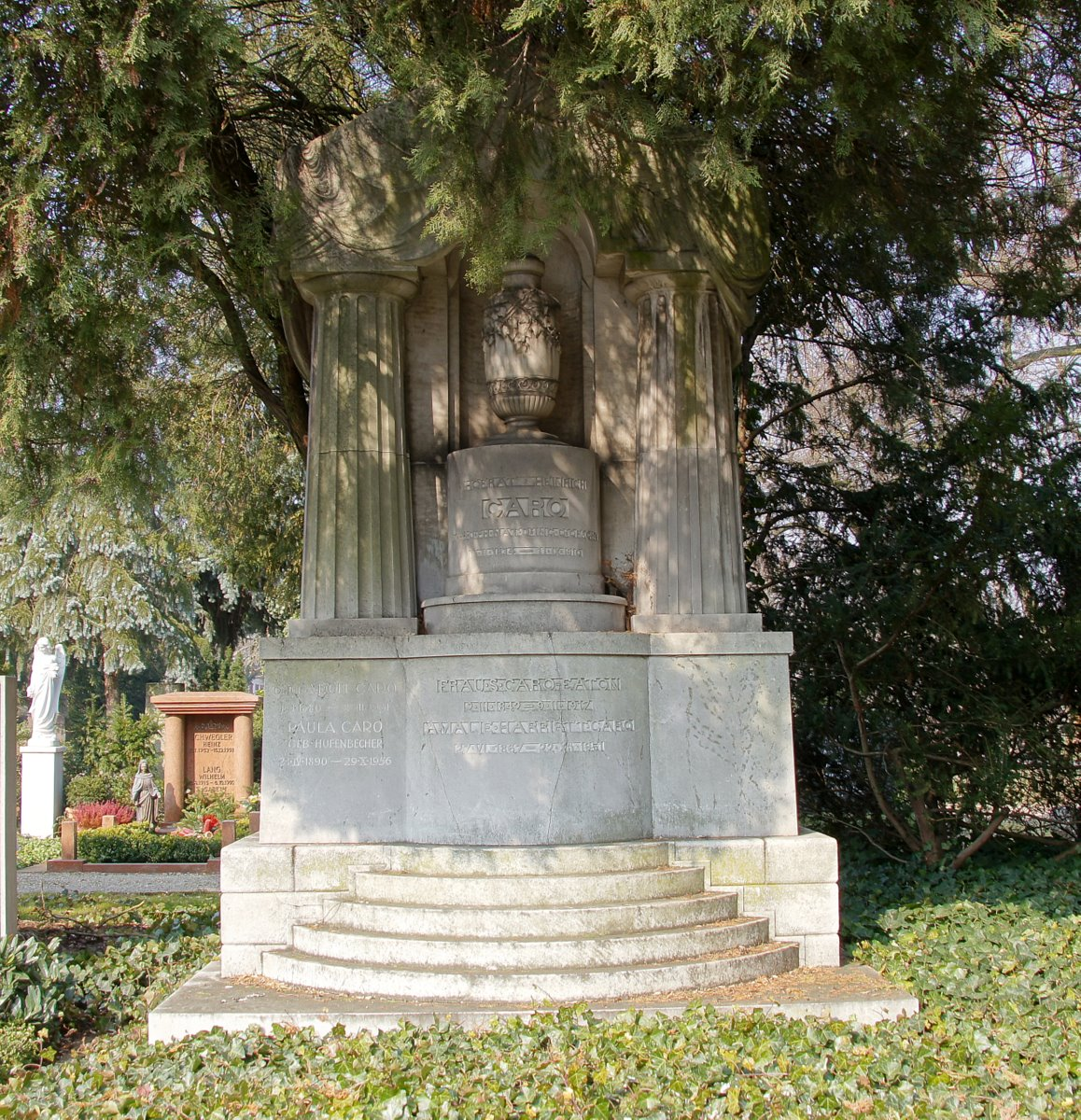
Caro's grave in Mannheim

== See also ==
- Nikodem Caro, co-inventor of the Frank–Caro process to produce calcium cyanamide
- Linde–Frank–Caro process, a method to produce hydrogen from water gas
- British Dyestuffs Corporation
