= Wenze =

Wenze may refer to:

- Wenze, Klötze, a village in Saxony-Anhalt, Germany
- Wenze Road Station, Hangzhou Metro, China
