= Strontium carbide =

Identifiers
3D model (JSmol)	Interactive image
ChemSpider	62853417
ECHA InfoCard	100.031.925
- InChI: InChI=1S/C2.Sr/c1-2;/q-2;+2 Key: QBIPZSRMYKVEBD-UHFFFAOYSA-N
- SMILES: [Sr]1C#C1

Properties
Chemical formula	SrC_{2}
Molar mass	111.64 g·mol^{−1}
Melting point	1,800 °C (3,270 °F; 2,070 K)

Related compounds
Other cations	Calcium carbide; Barium carbide; Yttrium carbide; Europium carbide; Mercury acetylide
- Except where otherwise noted, data are given for materials in their standard state (at 25 °C [77 °F], 100 kPa). Infobox references

Strontium carbide (also more precisely known as strontium acetylide or strontium dicarbide) is a salt with chemical formula SrC_{2}. It was first synthesized by Moissan in 1894. It consists of strontium cations Sr^{2+} and acetylide anions ^{−}C≡C^{−}.

== Preparation ==
Strontium carbide can be formed in an electric arc furnace from strontium carbonate and a reductant, such as a reducing sugar or magnesium metal. Alternatively, carbothermal reduction of strontium oxide with graphite begins around 150 °C and is catalyzed by calcium oxide. Classical organic chemistry syntheses include transmetallation from mercury acetylide or an acid-base reaction between dibenzylstrontium and acetylene, although these techniques often produce complexes with the solvent. Direct formation from the elements has a notional enthalpy of −20 kcal/mol.

== Properties ==
Nevertheless, strontium carbide may be only metastable when encapsulated in a fullerene. It slowly hydrolyzes in air to acetylene.

The material is polymorphic, forming a monoclinic crystal structure akin to calcium carbide II and a black tetragonal phase. Heated to 370 °C, it reversibly converts to a face-centered cubic (fcc) lattice. Yttrium carbide retains the fcc lattice down to room temperature; the difference is a 3e_{g} orbital that strontium lacks the electrons to fill. Cyanamide impurities stabilize one other strontium carbide polymorph, just as they do for calcium carbide. The stabilized calcium carbide polymorph is triclinic, and the strontium carbide polymorph is believed to be so as well.

At roughly 1800 °C, strontium carbide melts. It forms a solid solution with europium carbide, as Eu^{+}_{2} has an almost identical ionic radius to Sr^{+}_{2}.

== Applications ==
Strontium carbide is a chemical intermediate in an archaic carbon-14 dating technique: burning the material to be dated releases carbon dioxide, trapped as strontium carbonate. Magnesium then reduces the carbonate to strontium carbide and hydrolysis releases acetylene. The radioactive decay of the acetylene can then be observed directly or heating to 600 °C polymerizes the acetylene to benzene for a liquid scintillator.

Solid state metathesis of strontium carbide and a (complex) metal oxide gives the corresponding metal carbide and strontium oxide. The latter washes away easily in pure water.

== See also ==
- Calcium carbide
- Barium carbide
