= Adolph Frank =

German chemist (1834–1916)

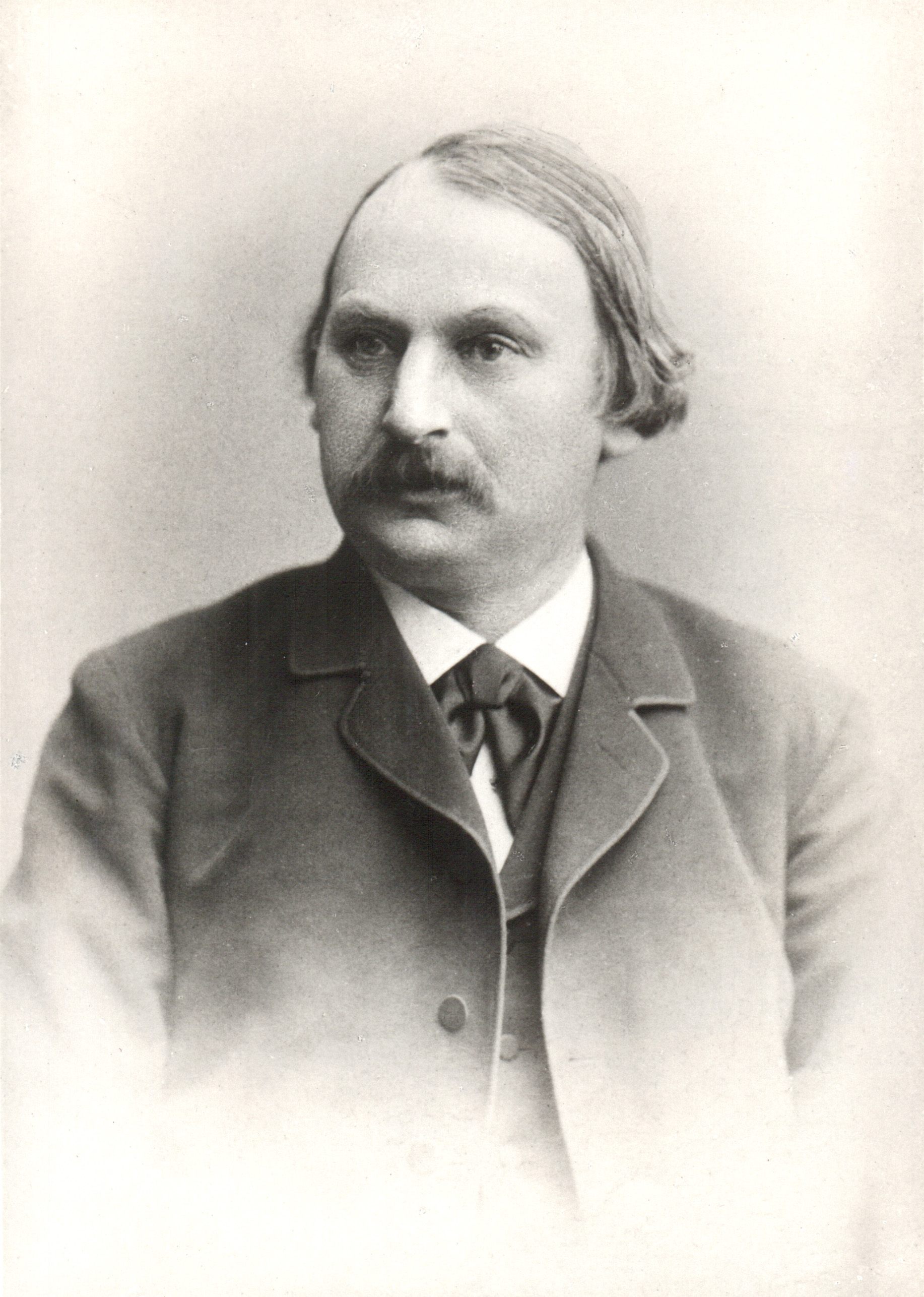
- Born: January 20, 1834; Klötze, Germany
- Died: May 30, 1916 (aged 82)
- Known for: Frank–Caro process Linde–Frank–Caro process
- Scientific career
- Fields: Chemistry, Engineering

Adolph Frank (January 20, 1834 – May 30, 1916) was a German-Jewish chemist, engineer, and businessman. He is best known for having discovered uses of potash and creating the industry.

Adolph Frank was born in the town of Klötze (now in Altmarkkreis Salzwedel in Altmark, Saxony-Anhalt. He was the son of a Jewish merchant, who—like Frank's grandfather—ran a general store. Frank studied the secondary school in Strelitz, now part of Neustrelitz, and then Jacobsohn School in Seesen. Then, he took up an apprenticeship as an apothecary in Osterburg, because he was interested in chemistry. From 1855 to 1857 he studied pharmacy, natural sciences and technology at the university in Berlin. In the same year he passed the examination to become an apothecary with a grade of 1 (the best possible grade in the German school system). In 1861 and 1862, he received his doctorate in chemistry from the university in Göttingen with a work about the production of sugar. Before this, in 1858, he had already received his first patent while working for a sugar beet factory in Staßfurt. He received this patent for having discovered a way to clean beet juice with clay soaps. The emphasis of his work was on the use of potash as an artificial fertilizer.

After 1860, he discovered and developed a deposit near Staßfurt and Leopoldshall, thus founding the industry. In 1861, he gained the patent on fertilizer on the basis of potassium chloride. A further invention of his was a method for the extraction of bromine from salt mines.

His work in the field of fertilizers led to the use of the fertilizer discovered by Sidney Gilchrist Thomas (German: Thomasmehl or English: Albert-Slag). Together with the German-Polish chemist Nikodem Caro, he developed the Frank-Caro process of extracting calcium cyanamide in 1899, which was the foundation of the nitrogen and calcium cyanamide fertilizer industry. In the same year those two and a few other businessmen founded Cyanidgesellschaft mbH, which would later become Bayrischen Stickstoff-Werke AG (BStW) in Trostberg.

The brown coloring of bottles, which is supposed to protect the content of the bottle from the effects of light, can also be attributed to him. He also researched the extraction of hydrogen for blimp together with Carl von Linde.

He was awarded the John Scott Medal of The Franklin Institute in 1893.
