= Linde–Frank–Caro process =

The Linde–Frank–Caro process is a method for hydrogen production by removing hydrogen and carbon dioxide from water gas by condensation. The process was invented in 1909 by Adolf Frank and developed with Carl von Linde and Heinrich Caro.

== Process description ==
Water gas is compressed to 20 bar and pumped into the Linde–Frank–Caro reactor. A water column removes most of the carbon dioxide and sulfur. Tubes with caustic soda then remove the remaining carbon dioxide, sulphur, and water from the gas stream. The gas enters a chamber and is cooled to −190 °C, resulting in the condensation of most of the gas to a liquid. The remaining gas is pumped to the next vessel where the nitrogen is liquefied by cooling to −205 °C, resulting in hydrogen gas as an end product.

== See also ==
- Water gas shift reaction
- Timeline of hydrogen technologies
- Frank–Caro process, another process used to produce cyanamide from calcium carbide and nitrogen gas in an electric furnace
