= Barium carbide =

Chemical compound

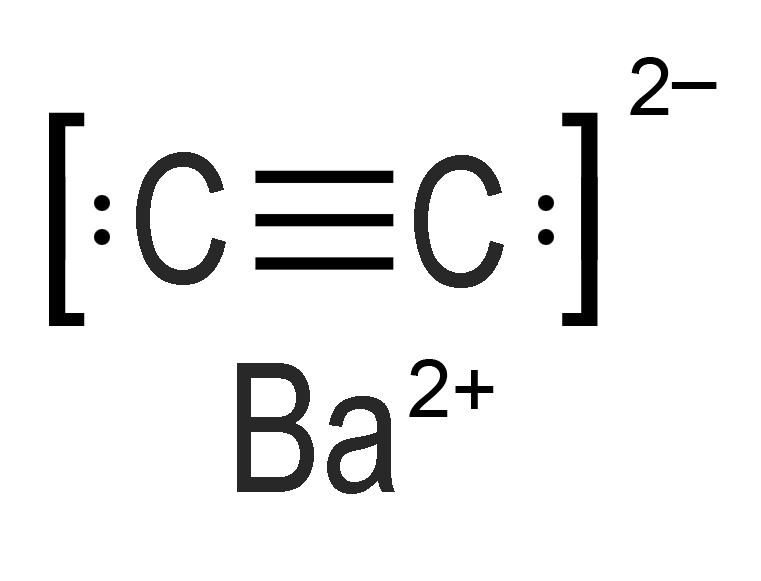

Names
- IUPAC name Barium ethynediide
- Other names Barium acetylide

Identifiers
CAS Number	50813-65-5
3D model (JSmol)	Interactive image
ChemSpider	13785937
EC Number	235-126-7
- InChI: InChI=1S/C2.Ba/c1-2;/q-2;+2 Key: DNQAUNUUVGPFFU-UHFFFAOYSA-N
- SMILES: [C-]#[C-].[Ba+2]

Properties
Chemical formula	BaC_{2}
Molar mass	161.349 g·mol^{−1}
Appearance	black crystalline solid
Density	3.75 g/cm^{3}

Related compounds
Other cations	Calcium carbide; Strontium carbide
- Except where otherwise noted, data are given for materials in their standard state (at 25 °C [77 °F], 100 kPa). Infobox references

Barium carbide (also referred to as barium ethynediide or barium acetylide) is a chemical compound in the carbide family having the chemical formula BaC_{2}. It consists of barium cations Ba^{2+} and acetylide anions ^{−}C≡C^{−}.

== Preparation ==
Barium carbide (BaC_{2}) can be synthesized by several high-temperature reduction methods. An impure form of the compound is obtained by reducing powdered barium carbonate with metallic magnesium in the presence of carbon.

Another laboratory-scale method involves the direct reduction of carbon dioxide with heated metallic barium at approximately 600 °C, producing barium carbide as an intermediate in studies of acetylene formation.

Barium carbide may also be prepared by heating a mixture of a barium amalgam and powdered carbon under a stream of hydrogen, which facilitates the removal of mercury and promotes carbide formation.

The pure compound is typically obtained by carbothermal reduction of barium oxide with carbon at elevated temperatures, a method analogous to the industrial preparation of other alkaline earth metal carbides.

== Properties ==
Barium carbide reacts similarly to calcium carbide, but it's more fusible. When exposed to extreme heat, the barium will evaporate leaving behind crystals of graphite. It can also absorb the carbon in a solution at high temperature.

== Hazards ==
Barium carbide can cause damage to the GI tract and irritation in the skin and eyes.
