= Chilling requirement =

Cold weather requirement in agriculture

The chilling requirement of a fruit is the minimum period of cold weather after which a fruit-bearing tree will blossom productively. It is often expressed in chill hours, which can be calculated in different ways, all of which essentially involve adding up the total amount of time in a winter spent at certain temperatures.

Some bulbs have chilling requirements to bloom, and some seeds have chilling requirements to sprout.

Biologically, the chilling requirement is a way of ensuring that vernalization occurs.

== Chilling units or chilling hours ==
A chilling unit in agriculture is a metric of a plant's exposure to chilling temperatures. Chilling temperatures extend from freezing point to, depending on the model, 7 °C (45 °F) or even 16 °C (60 °F). One chilling unit, in the simplest models, is equal to one hour's exposure to the chilling temperature; these units are summed up for a whole season. Advanced models assign different weights to different temperature bands.

Contrary to popular belief, lack of chilling hours does not usually kill a plant, nor prevent a dormant plant from eventually leafing out. However, it may add stress that can be one factor in a plant’s demise; as such, a previously injured plant may not survive long after a warm winter. Fruit trees that do not meet chilling requirements in a given season will not leaf or flower at normal times or for normal durations, and may only produce a few or no fruit.

Stone fruit trees and certain other plants of temperate climate develop next year's buds in the summer. In the autumn the buds become dormant, and the switch to proper, healthy dormancy is triggered by a certain minimum exposure to chilling temperatures. Lack of such exposure results in delayed and substandard foliation, flowering and fruiting.

== Requirements ==
According to Fishman, chilling in trees acts in two stages. The first is reversible: chilling helps to build up the precursor to dormancy, but the process can be easily reversed with a rise in temperature. After the level of precursor reaches a certain threshold, dormancy becomes irreversible and will not be affected by short-term warm temperature peaks. Apples have the highest chilling requirements of all fruit trees, followed by apricots and, lastly, peaches. Apple cultivars have a diverse range of permissible minimum chilling: most have been bred for temperate weather, but Gala and Fuji can be successfully grown in subtropical Bakersfield, California.

Peach cultivars in Texas range in their requirements from 100 chilling units (Florida Grande cultivar, zoned for low chill regions) to 1,000 units (Surecrop, zoned for high chill regions). Planting a low-chilling cultivar in a high-chill region risks loss of a year's harvest when an early bloom is hit by a spring frost. A high-chilling cultivar planted in a low-chill region will, quite likely, never fruit at all. A four-year study of Ruston Red Alabama peach, which has a threshold of 850 chilling units, demonstrated that a seasonal chilling deficiency of less than 50 units has no effect on harvest. Deficiency of 50 to 100 units may result in loss of up to 50% of expected harvest. Deficiency of 250 hours and more is a sure loss of practically whole harvest; the few fruit will be of very poor quality and have no market value. Rest-breaking agents (e.g. hydrogen cyanamide, trade name BudPro or Dormex), applied in spring, can partially mitigate the effects of insufficient chilling. BudPro can substitute for up to 300 hours of chilling, but an excessive spraying and timing error can easily damage the buds. Other products such as Dormex use stabilizing compounds.

Chilling of orange trees has two effects. First, it increases production of carotenoids and decreases chlorophyll content of the fruit, improving their appearance and, ultimately, their market value. Second, the "quasi-dormancy" experienced by orange trees triggers concentrated flowering in spring, as opposed to more or less uniform round-the-year flowering and fruiting in warmer climates.

Biennial plants like cabbage, sugar beet, celery and carrots need chilling to develop second-year flowering buds. Excessive chilling in the early stages of a sugar beet seedling, on the contrary, may trigger undesired growth of a flowering stem (bolting) in its first year. This phenomenon has been offset by breeding sugar beet cultivars with a higher minimum chilling threshold. Such cultivars can be seeded earlier than normal without the risk of bolting.

== Models ==
All models require hourly recording of temperatures. The simplest model assigns one chilling unit for every full hour at temperatures below 7 °C (45 °F). A slightly more sophisticated model excludes freezing temperatures, which do not contribute to proper dormancy cycle, and counts only hours with temperatures between 0 °C (32 °F) and 7 °C (45 °F).

The Utah model assigns different weights to different temperature bands; a full unit per hour is assigned only to temperatures between 3 °C (37 °F) and 9 °C (48 °F). Maximum effect is achieved at 7 °C (45 °F). Temperatures between 13 °C (55 °F) and 16 °C (60 °F) (the threshold between chilling and warm weather) have zero weight, and higher temperature have negative weights: they reduce the beneficial effects of an already accumulated chilling hours.

Southwick et al. wrote that neither of these models are accurate enough to account for the application of rest-breaking agents widely used in modern farming. They advocated the use of a dynamic model tailored to the two-stage explanation of dormancy.
