= Kusey =

- Stadtteil of Klötze
- Interactive map of Kusey
- Location within Germany Location within Saxony-Anhalt
- Coordinates: 52°34′55″N 11°5′33″E
- Country: Germany
- State: Saxony-Anhalt
- District: Altmarkkreis Salzwedel
- Town: Klötze

Area
  - Total: 37.77 km^{2} (14.58 sq mi)
- Elevation: 58 m (190 ft)

Population (2006-12-31)
  - Total: 1,081
  - Density: 28.62/km^{2} (74.13/sq mi)
- Time zone: UTC+01:00 (CET)
  - Summer (DST): UTC+02:00 (CEST)
- Postal codes: 38486
- Dialling codes: 039005
- Vehicle registration: SAW

Kusey is a village and a former municipality in the district Altmarkkreis Salzwedel, in Saxony-Anhalt, Germany. Since 1 January 2010, it is part of the town Klötze.
