= Nikodem Caro =

Polish chemist (1871–1935)

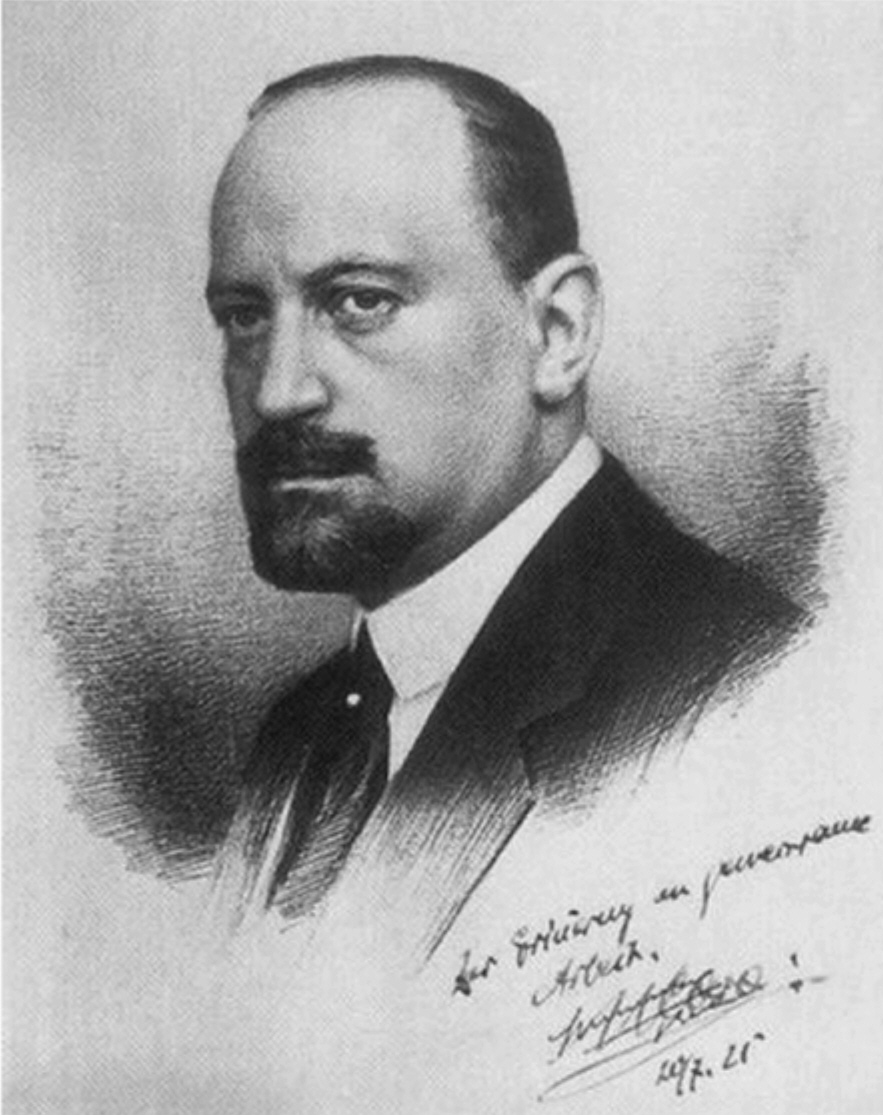
A portrait of Nikodem Caro

Nikodem Caro (Polish pronunciation: [ɲiˈkɔ.dɛm tsarɔ]; 23 May 1871, Łódź, then Russian Empire – 27 June 1935, Rome, Italy) was an industrial chemist and entrepreneur. Caro was born in Łódź, to a prominent Silesian-Jewish family. He studied chemistry in Berlin at the Technische Hochschule in Berlin (now Technische Universität Berlin) and got his doctorate from Rostock University. From 1895 on he worked in the Deutsche Dynamit AG with Adolph Frank on the development of calcium cyanamide as a means of fixing nitrogen, hence the Frank-Caro process. Caro became an important figure in the nitrogen fixation industry and a rival of Fritz Haber.

Caro also contributed to the production of combat gases used by German troops during World War I. After the war he became the first president of Bayerische Stickstoffwerke AG.

Caro is the author of many works about various elements, synthesis a chemical compounds actions e.g. Gewinnung von Chlor und Salzsäure (1893), Landwirtschaftliche Untersuchungen (1895), Handbuch für Acetylen (1904), Die Torflager als Kraftquellen (1907).

After Hitler's rise to power he left Berlin, emigrating through Switzerland to Italy. Caro died in 1935 and was buried in Zürich.

== See also ==
- Heinrich Caro, inventor of the "Caro's acid" (peroxymonosulfuric acid)
- Poison gas in World War I
