= Albright and Wilson =

Former British chemical manufacturer

- Industry: Manufacturing
- Founded: 1856
- Headquarters: United Kingdom

Albright and Wilson was founded in 1856 as a United Kingdom manufacturer of potassium chlorate and white phosphorus for the match industry. For much of its first 100 years of existence, phosphorus-derived chemicals formed the majority of its products.

It was set up as a partnership between two Quakers, Arthur Albright, and John Edward Wilson. It became a private limited company, Albright & Wilson Ltd, in 1892; and it remained a double family-owned firm, for nearly 100 years, until 5 March 1948, when it became a public company.

Albright and Wilson expanded considerably into silicones, detergents, food additives, metal finishing chemicals, strontium based chemicals and chromium based chemicals. It was the second largest chemical manufacturer in the United Kingdom; although it was always very much smaller than ICI.

In 1971 Tenneco bought a part of Albright and Wilson's share holdings; and in 1978 obtained full ownership. In the short term, the company retained its own identity; however many of its subsidiaries were sold off. In 1995, Tenneco divested many of its assets; and parts of the original core of Albright and Wilson were transferred into a new public company, Albright and Wilson Plc which was floated on the stock market, in February of that year. However, just four years later, following disappointing results, the French chemical company Rhodia acquired Albright and Wilson in March 2000 and the century-and-a-half old name finally disappeared except in India, Australia, New Zealand and the Philippines.

Parts of the original Albright and Wilson company are now owned by the Huntsman Corporation after their sale in 2000.

After a large fire at its Avonmouth plant in 1996, which caused the temporary closure of local motorways and rail services, Albright and Wilson were fined £60,000.

== The move to Oldbury ==
In 1842 Arthur Albright, a trained chemist, became a Partner in the Birmingham chemical firm of John and Edmund Sturge; his sister had married Edmund Sturge who was also a Quaker. The Sturges were already manufacturing potassium chlorate for the match industry, at their chemical works at Selly Oak, adjacent to the Worcester and Birmingham Canal. Albright therefore added the production of white phosphorus in 1844.

In 1850 the production of potassium chlorate and white phosphorus was moved to Langley Green, Oldbury, West Midlands; and production of white phosphorus restarted in 1851.

The new site was located next door to the firm of Chance and Hunt in order to obtain access to a supply of sulfuric acid and hydrochloric acid; and of coal from the Black Country coal fields. It was also adjacent to two different arms of the Birmingham Canal Navigations, (the BCN), one leading off the Titford Canal, so it had good transport links.

Production of the red form of phosphorus, "amorphous phosphorus" was commenced by Arthur Albright in 1851, by heating white phosphorus in a sealed crucible under a vacuum. It had been discovered by Professor Schrötter, in Vienna and patented by him. However, it was explosive to make and Albright discovered a safe means of production.

On 31 December 1854 Albright terminated his partnership with the Sturges. He formed Albright and Wilson with John Edward Wilson, a merchant, the following year. In 1856 John Edward Wilson became a partner, and the new partnership was known as Albright and Wilson. In 1857 John Wilson married the sister of Rachel Albright (Albright's wife).

The Sturge Brothers continued as manufacturing chemists at Birmingham, but moved their works to Stirchley; and no longer had any involvement with phosphorus.

Oldbury remained the Headquarters of Albright and Wilson for most of the company's existence, eventually becoming known as the Oldbury Division. The Oldbury site was also the location of its central Research Laboratories.

The business was so highly regarded in Oldbury that a new secondary school opened in the town in the 1930s was named Albright Secondary Modern School.

The firm also maintained a leased London office, at Knightsbridge Green. In October 1974 it moved its Industrial Chemicals Divisional Offices, from Oldbury, to Warley. The six-storey office block, A&W House, at 210–222 Hagley Road, was originally rented for 25 years. Fifteen years later, parts of the Head Office were moved from Knightsbridge Green to A&W House. In October 1991 the Head Office moved to A&W House; and in 1997 the freehold of the building was purchased. A&W House was sold in 2001; and is now known as Quadrant West.

== Phosphorus and match phosphates ==
In the early days, white phosphorus was obtained from bone ash by treating them with hydrochloric acid to produce precipitated phosphates. Then heating the meta phosphate for several days in a sealed crucible, in a retort, and distilling off phosphorus vapour, under water. Huge quantities of coal were needed for heating these retorts.

The production of white phosphorus was improved by using phosphate rock and sulfuric acid instead of bone ash and hydrochloric acid; and by the use of reverberatory furnaces instead of the direct-heated furnaces.

White and amorphous phosphorus remained the main product of Albright and Wilson until World War I.

White phosphorus was poisonous to match makers, causing Phossy jaw. Albright and Wilson exhibited amorphous phosphorus at the Great Exhibition of 1851, at The Crystal Palace. A sample was taken away for testing by the two Swedish brothers Lundström, to make an experimental match composition. In 1855, just before the Paris Exhibition, John Edvard Lundstrom found that the matches were still usable. He placed a large order for amorphous phosphorus with Albright and Wilson and this led to the foundation of the Swedish Safety Match Industry.

In 1899 Albright and Wilson added phosphorus sesquisulfide production. They were the first company to produce phosphorus sesquisulfide commercially: it was fiery and dangerous to make. Two French chemists, Savene and Cahen, proved that year that it was non-poisonous and could be used to make safety matches. Savene and Cahen Patented the match formula.

In 1929 the British Match Corporation, formerly known as Bryant and May, set up a jointly owned company with Albright and Wilson: The A & W Match Phosphorus Company. It took over ownership of a small part of the Oldbury site concerned with producing amorphous phosphorus and phosphorus sesquisulfide.

== Expansion ==
Albright and Wilson expanded both by opening new sites and by buying up its rivals. The original phosphorus-based part of the company became known as the Oldbury Division. As they moved into new areas, they set up new Divisions.

Just after the end of World War I, Albright and Wilson took over the Holmes' Marine Life Protection Association. It remained within Oldbury Division.

== Ann Street, Widnes ==
The works in Widnes, Cheshire, were used for Phosphorus production from 1933. The works started with 2 furnaces and gradually extended to 5. The manufacture of Phosphates continued as well as the production of Calgon (water softener). All the products produced here were based on Phosphoric Acid. In 1983, Albright and Wilson celebrated 50 Years at Ann Street.

Albright and Wilson was taken over by Rhodia and subsequently by Thermphos and operated until it closed in 2013, with the loss of 25 jobs. In 2010, 69 jobs were axed when production of food phosphates was transferred to Germany and the Netherlands, as a result of lower production costs abroad. As of 2015, the premises are being demolished, after Thermphos went into administration in September 2012 and following the full closure of the plant in 2013.

== Oldbury Division ==
In 1888 a patent was granted to four people from Wolverhampton covering the use of an electric furnace to produce white phosphorus from phosphate rock; and in 1890 they set up a works at Wednesfield to produce phosphorus. Albright and Wilson bought the patent and the works; and ran it for two years whilst they built their own furnace at Oldbury. The Wednesfield works was then closed down.

White phosphorus continued in production at Oldbury until 1972 when production was moved to Newfoundland. Bulk liquid white phosphorus was then transferred by special bulk tanker ship back to Portishead, Somerset. Unfortunately the move to Newfoundland had been inadequately planned and the Company encountered serious production problems with its new giant electric furnaces – several times larger than the Oldbury machines – and with the availability of skilled local labour. These problems contributed to the company's poor financial performance and precipitated the take-over by Tenneco.

== Marchon Division ==
In 1955 Albright and Wilson purchased Marchon Products Ltd based in Whitehaven, which produced phosphorus-based detergents by the "wet" process. The A&W Group now controlled production of phosphorus compounds by both important manufacturing routes. However, the phosphate detergent business, which was the bread-and-butter market for Marchon, ran into terminal decline in the late 1970s as the eutrophication of inland waterways by pollution from detergent phosphate residues pressed the detergent formulators to move away from phosphates, thus removing Marchon's prime product application area.

The name "Marchon" ended when the French company, Rhodia, took over Albright and Wilson in 1999.

The site closed down in 2005 and was demolished between 2007 and 2012.
