= Kunrau =

- Stadtteil of Klötze
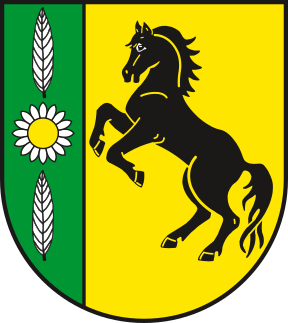
- Coat of arms
- Interactive map of Kunrau
- Location within Germany Location within Saxony-Anhalt
- Coordinates: 52°33′58″N 11°1′6″E
- Country: Germany
- State: Saxony-Anhalt
- District: Altmarkkreis Salzwedel
- Town: Klötze

Area
  - Total: 22.98 km^{2} (8.87 sq mi)
- Elevation: 58 m (190 ft)

Population (2006-12-31)
  - Total: 920
  - Density: 40/km^{2} (100/sq mi)
- Time zone: UTC+01:00 (CET)
  - Summer (DST): UTC+02:00 (CEST)
- Postal codes: 38486
- Dialling codes: 039008
- Vehicle registration: SAW

Kunrau is a village and a former municipality in the district Altmarkkreis Salzwedel, in Saxony-Anhalt, Germany. Since 1 January 2010, it is part of the town Klötze.
