= Dönitz (Altmark) =

- Stadtteil of Klötze
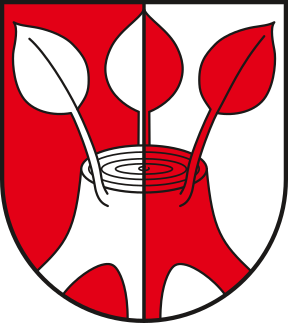
- Coat of arms
- Interactive map of Dönitz
- Location within Germany Location within Saxony-Anhalt
- Coordinates: 52°36′48″N 11°02′36″E
- Country: Germany
- State: Saxony-Anhalt
- District: Altmarkkreis Salzwedel
- Town: Klötze

Area
  - Total: 7.00 km^{2} (2.70 sq mi)
- Elevation: 67 m (220 ft)

Population (2006-12-31)
  - Total: 138
  - Density: 19.7/km^{2} (51.1/sq mi)
- Time zone: UTC+01:00 (CET)
  - Summer (DST): UTC+02:00 (CEST)
- Postal codes: 38486
- Dialling codes: 039008
- Vehicle registration: SAW

Dönitz is a village and a former municipality in the district Altmarkkreis Salzwedel, in Saxony-Anhalt, Germany. Since 1 January 2010, it is part of the town Klötze.
