= Steimke =

- Stadtteil of Klötze
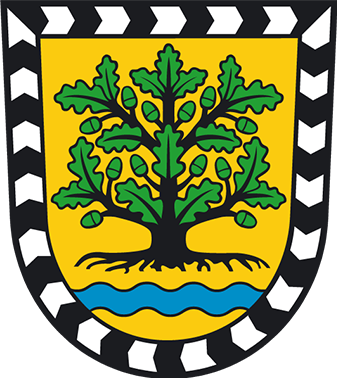
- Coat of arms
- Interactive map of Steimke
- Location within Germany Location within Saxony-Anhalt
- Coordinates: 52°35′12″N 10°58′00″E
- Country: Germany
- State: Saxony-Anhalt
- District: Altmarkkreis Salzwedel
- Town: Klötze

Area
  - Total: 18.54 km^{2} (7.16 sq mi)
- Elevation: 67 m (220 ft)

Population (2006-12-31)
  - Total: 432
  - Density: 23.3/km^{2} (60.3/sq mi)
- Time zone: UTC+01:00 (CET)
  - Summer (DST): UTC+02:00 (CEST)
- Postal codes: 38486
- Dialling codes: 039008
- Vehicle registration: SAW

Steimke is a village and a former municipality in the district Altmarkkreis Salzwedel, in Saxony-Anhalt, Germany. Since 1 January 2010, it is part of the town Klötze.
