= Neuendorf, Saxony-Anhalt =

Neuendorf
- Stadtteil of Klötze
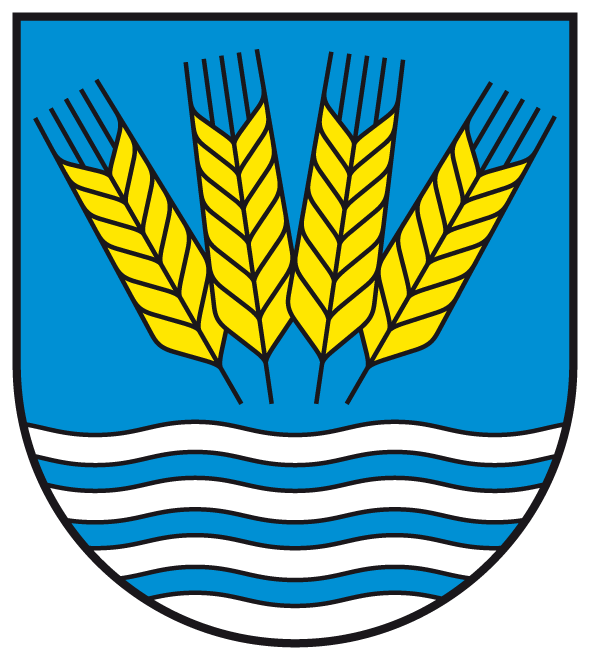
- Coat of arms
- Interactive map of Neuendorf
- Location within Germany Location within Saxony-Anhalt
- Coordinates: 52°40′36″N 11°13′00″E
- Country: Germany
- State: Saxony-Anhalt
- District: Altmarkkreis Salzwedel
- Town: Klötze

Area
  - Total: 28.05 km^{2} (10.83 sq mi)
- Elevation: 45 m (148 ft)

Population (2006-12-31)
  - Total: 609
  - Density: 21.7/km^{2} (56.2/sq mi)
- Time zone: UTC+01:00 (CET)
  - Summer (DST): UTC+02:00 (CEST)
- Postal codes: 38486
- Dialling codes: 03909
- Vehicle registration: SAW

Neuendorf (German pronunciation: [ˈnɔʏəndɔʁf]) is a village and a former municipality in the district Altmarkkreis Salzwedel, in Saxony-Anhalt, Germany. Since 1 January 2010, it is part of the town Klötze.
