= Holmes' Marine Life Protection Association =

The Holmes' Marine Life Protection Association was a United Kingdom company set up in the 19th century to produce marine signal lights and foghorns. It was founded by Nathaniel John Holmes, a telegraph engineer from Middlesex; and it passed to his son Joseph R. Holmes. The company was taken over by Albright and Wilson in 1919.

== Holmes' patents ==
In 1875 Holmes obtained a British Patent for a marine audible alarm signal (B.P. 2564 of 1875); and in 1877 he bought, for £80 Pound Sterling, a half-share of John Grey's Patent (B.P. 2564 of 1868) for Improvements in fog alarms.

In 1876 he obtained, with J.H. Player as co-applicant, a provisional application for Improvements in self-igniting and inextinguishable signal lights for marine and other purposes; it became British Patent 4215 of 1876.

Further patents were taken out by Holmes in 1885 and 1887; and his company up to 1906.

== Marine markers and signals ==
In July 1873 he demonstrated his Patent Signal Light to the Liverpool shipping company P and W Maclellan and was awarded a Certificate of Merit. It was based on the use of calcium phosphide, which they initially made themselves at Feltham, Middlesex, before moving to Barking. Up to the end of World War I the Holmes' Marine Life Protection Association sold lifebuoy lights and distress lights; and sales increased dramatically during the war.

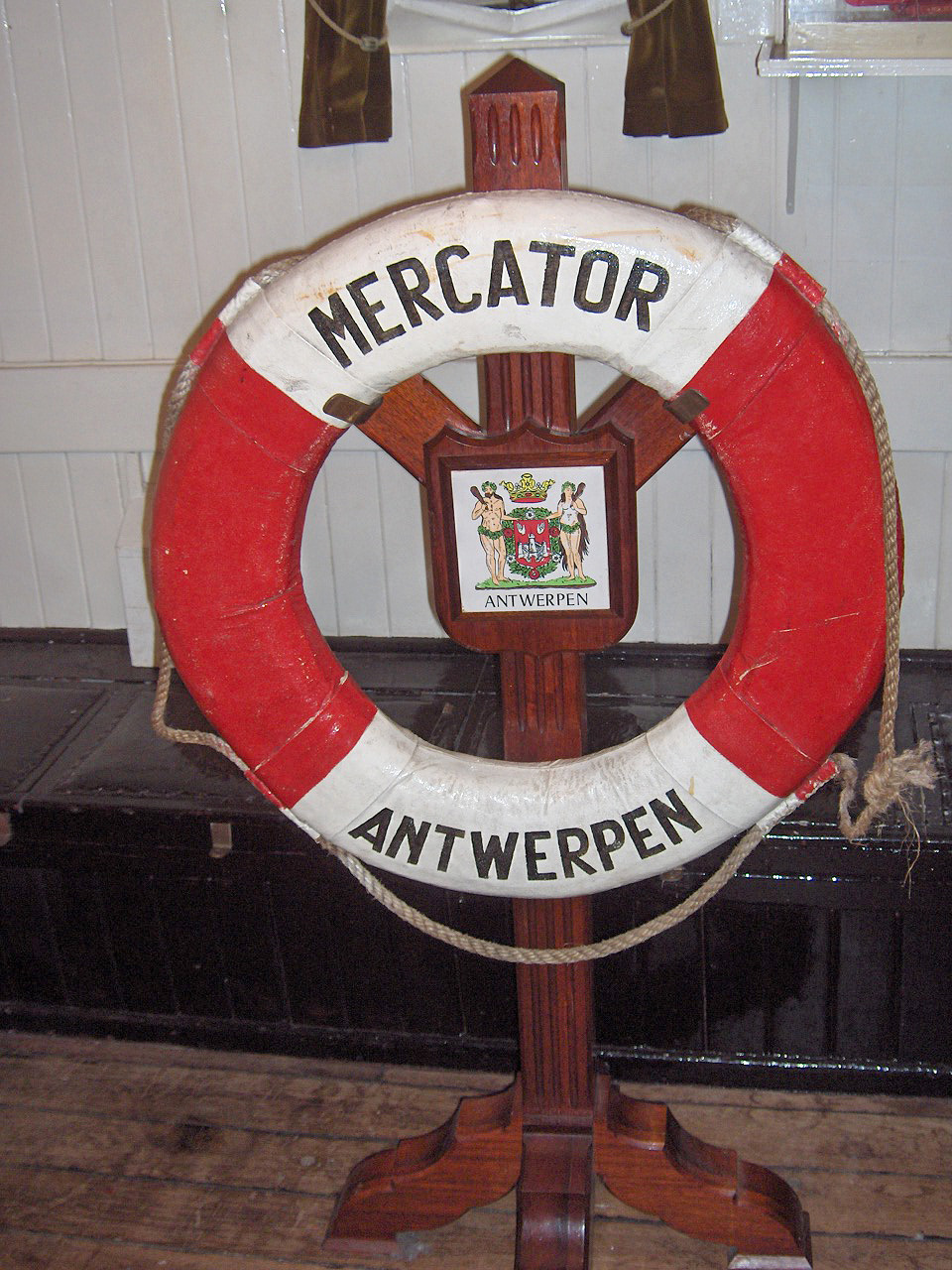
Lifebuoy. Photo: Georges Jansoone

The provision of Lifebuoy lights was mandatory for British seagoing vessels under Board of Trade Regulations. Holmes' lights were sold under various Trade names: The Handyman's Light for lifebuoys; the Manwell-Holmes Marine Light distress light for merchant vessels; and a modified Handyman Light for lifebuoys for the Admiralty. They also produced a distress signal, the Deck Flare.

They were all charged with calcium carbide, it produced acetylene gas when water was dripped onto it. They also included a small quantity of calcium phosphide, which in contact with water produced impure phosphine, it spontaneously ignited, thereby igniting the acetylene.

The Handyman lifebuoy light had a buoyancy chamber filled with air to keep it afloat. It was attached to the lifebuoy with a long cord, and to the boat with a shorter cord. When the lifebuoy was thrown overboard, the short cord pulled away two plugs, one to let sea water in and one to let gas out. For the mast-head distress signal light and the Deck Flare the two plugs were removed by hand and the units placed in a bucket of water.

== See also ==
- Albright and Wilson
- Calcium carbide
- Calcium phosphide
- Foghorn
- Lifebuoy

== Sources ==
- Threlfall, Richard E., (1951). The Story of 100 Years of Phosphorus Making: 1851 - 1951. Oldbury: Albright and Wilson Ltd.
