= Neuferchau =

- Stadtteil of Klötze
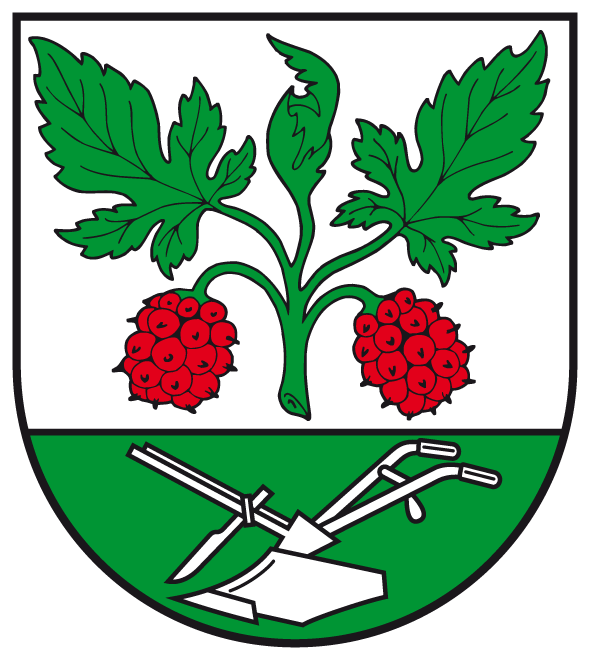
- Coat of arms
- Interactive map of Neuferchau
- Location within Germany Location within Saxony-Anhalt
- Coordinates: 52°34′27″N 11°3′50″E
- Country: Germany
- State: Saxony-Anhalt
- District: Altmarkkreis Salzwedel
- Town: Klötze

Area
  - Total: 9.60 km^{2} (3.71 sq mi)
- Elevation: 62 m (203 ft)

Population (2006-12-31)
  - Total: 422
  - Density: 44.0/km^{2} (114/sq mi)
- Time zone: UTC+01:00 (CET)
  - Summer (DST): UTC+02:00 (CEST)
- Postal codes: 38486
- Dialling codes: 039008
- Vehicle registration: SAW

Neuferchau is a village and a former municipality in the district Altmarkkreis Salzwedel, in Saxony-Anhalt, Germany. Since 1 January 2010, it is part of the town Klötze.
