= Schwiesau =

- Stadtteil of Klötze
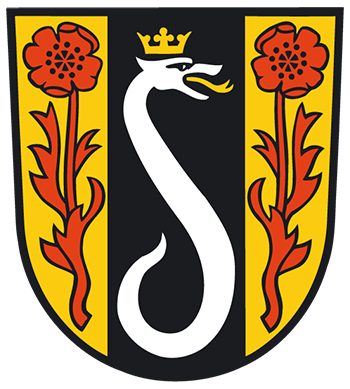
- Coat of arms
- Interactive map of Schwiesau
- Location within Germany Location within Saxony-Anhalt
- Coordinates: 52°35′49″N 11°15′29″E
- Country: Germany
- State: Saxony-Anhalt
- District: Altmarkkreis Salzwedel
- Town: Klötze

Area
  - Total: 14.50 km^{2} (5.60 sq mi)
- Elevation: 87 m (285 ft)

Population (2006-12-31)
  - Total: 369
  - Density: 25.4/km^{2} (65.9/sq mi)
- Time zone: UTC+01:00 (CET)
  - Summer (DST): UTC+02:00 (CEST)
- Postal codes: 39638
- Dialling codes: 039085
- Vehicle registration: SAW

Schwiesau is a village and a former municipality in the district Altmarkkreis Salzwedel, in Saxony-Anhalt, Germany. Since 1 January 2010, it is part of the town Klötze.
