= Immekath =

- Stadtteil of Klötze
- Interactive map of Immekath
- Location within Germany Location within Saxony-Anhalt
- Coordinates: 52°37′24″N 11°04′36″E
- Country: Germany
- State: Saxony-Anhalt
- District: Altmarkkreis Salzwedel
- Town: Klötze

Area
  - Total: 21.34 km^{2} (8.24 sq mi)
- Elevation: 81 m (266 ft)

Population (2006-12-31)
  - Total: 618
  - Density: 29.0/km^{2} (75.0/sq mi)
- Time zone: UTC+01:00 (CET)
  - Summer (DST): UTC+02:00 (CEST)
- Postal codes: 38486
- Dialling codes: 03909
- Vehicle registration: SAW

Immekath is a village and a former municipality in the district Altmarkkreis Salzwedel, in Saxony-Anhalt, Germany. Since 1 January 2010, it is part of the town Klötze.
