= Jahrstedt =

- Stadtteil of Klötze
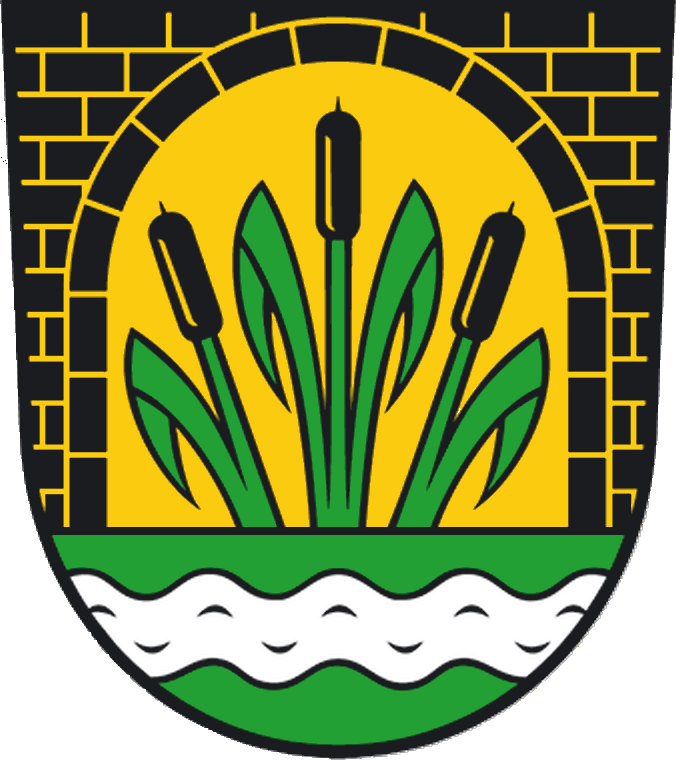
- Coat of arms
- Interactive map of Jahrstedt
- Location within Germany Location within Saxony-Anhalt
- Coordinates: 52°33′36″N 10°58′24″E
- Country: Germany
- State: Saxony-Anhalt
- District: Altmarkkreis Salzwedel
- Town: Klötze

Area
  - Total: 20.39 km^{2} (7.87 sq mi)
- Elevation: 57 m (187 ft)

Population (2006-12-31)
  - Total: 811
  - Density: 39.8/km^{2} (103/sq mi)
- Time zone: UTC+01:00 (CET)
  - Summer (DST): UTC+02:00 (CEST)
- Postal codes: 38486
- Dialling codes: 039008
- Vehicle registration: SAW

Jahrstedt is a village and a former municipality in the district Altmarkkreis Salzwedel, in Saxony-Anhalt, Germany. Since 1 January 2010, it is part of the town Klötze.
