= Cyanamide =

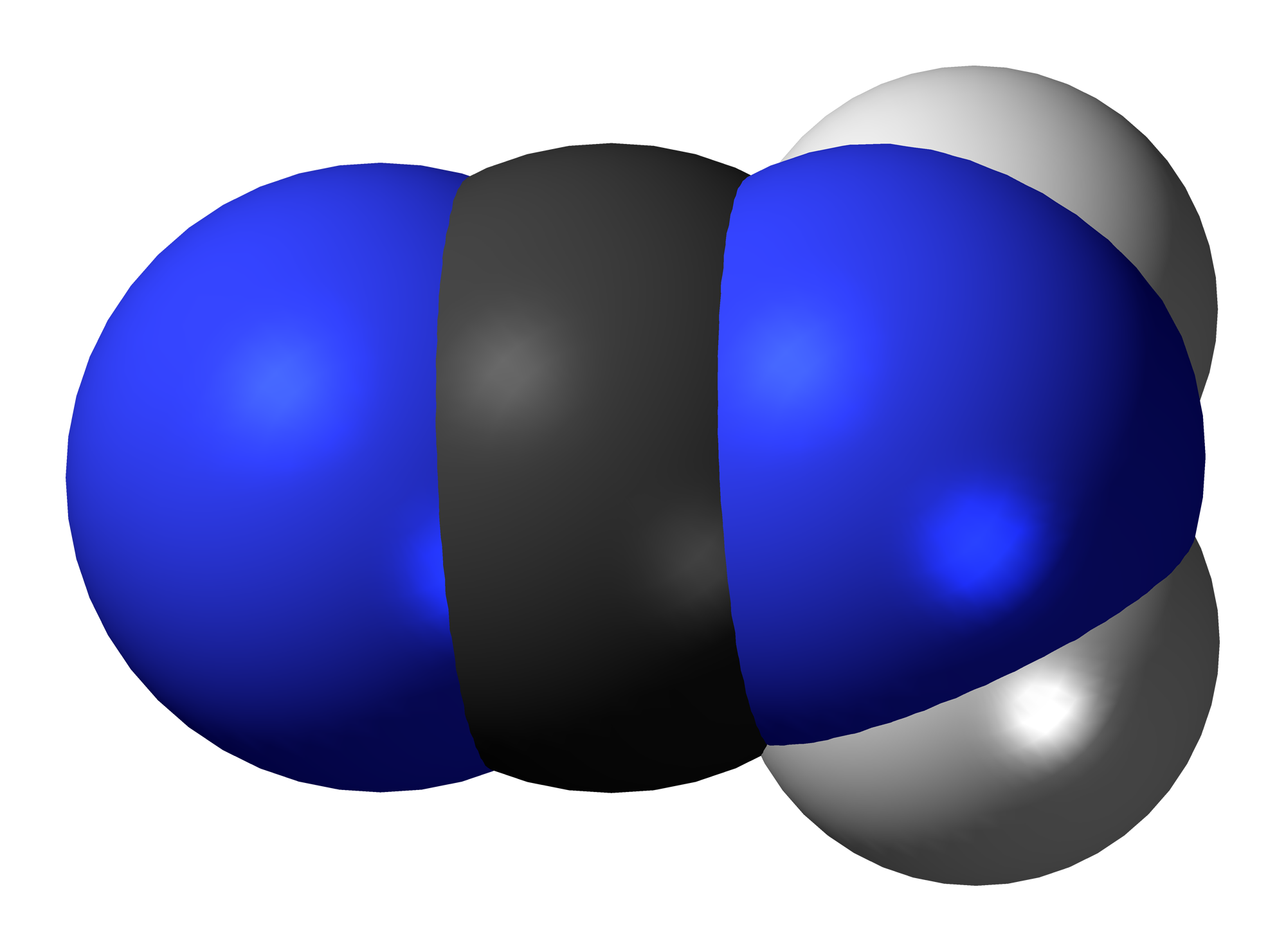

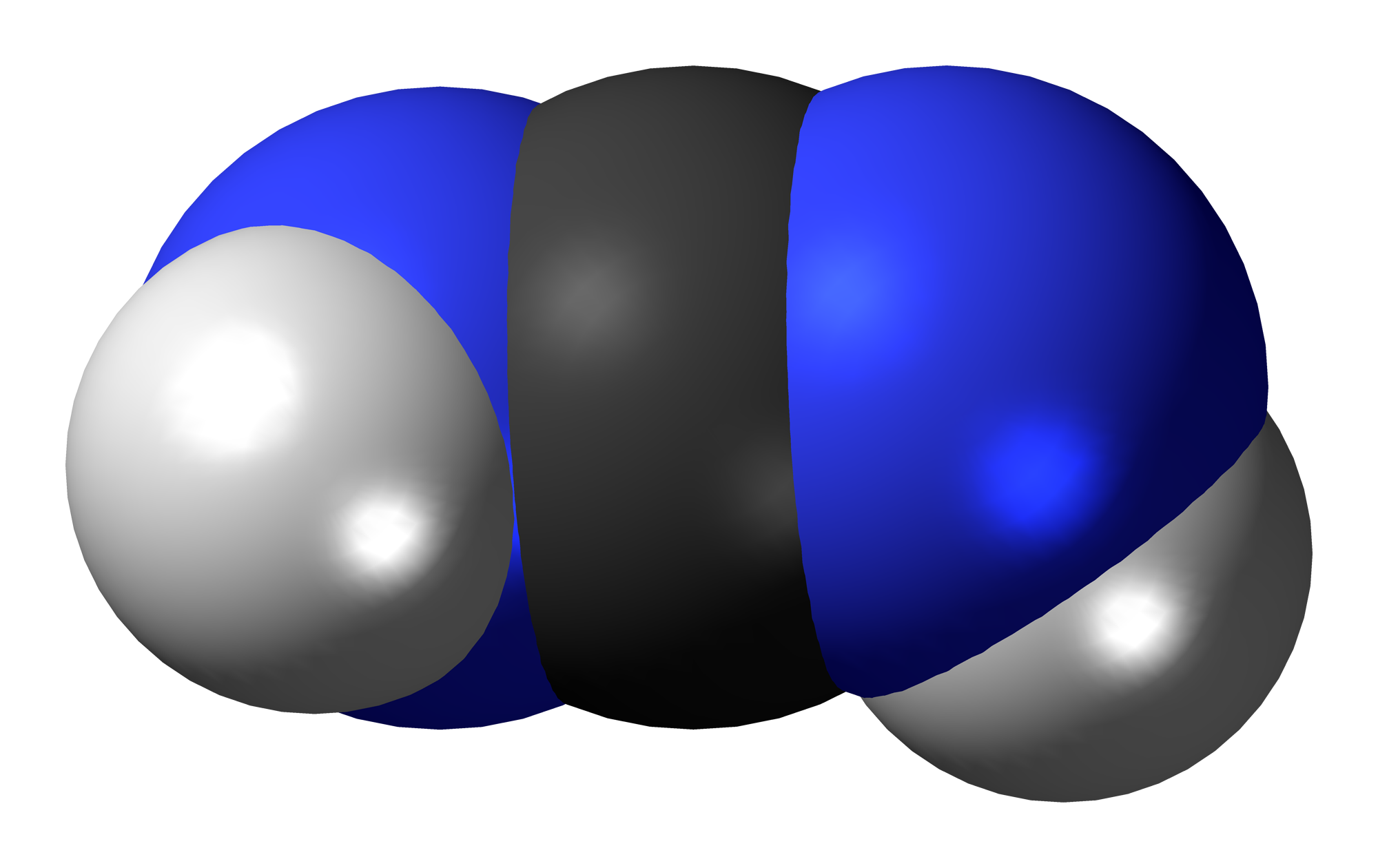

Names
- IUPAC name Cyanamide
- Other names Amidocyanogen, carbamonitrile, carbimide, carbodiimide, cyanoamine, cyanoazane, N-cyanoamine, cyanogenamide, cyanogen amide, cyanogen nitride, diiminomethane, hydrogen cyanamide, methanediimine

Identifiers
CAS Number	420-04-2
3D model (JSmol)	Interactive image; carbodiimide isomer: Interactive image
ChEBI	CHEBI:16698
ChEMBL	ChEMBL56279
ChemSpider	9480
DrugBank	DB02679
ECHA InfoCard	100.006.358
EC Number	206-992-3
Gmelin Reference	784
KEGG	D00123
PubChem CID	9864
RTECS number	GS5950000
UNII	21CP7826LC
UN number	2811
CompTox Dashboard (EPA)	DTXSID9034490
- InChI: InChI=1S/CH2N2/c2-1-3/h2H2 Key: XZMCDFZZKTWFGF-UHFFFAOYSA-N; InChI=1/CH2N2/c2-1-3/h2H2 Key: XZMCDFZZKTWFGF-UHFFFAOYAW
- SMILES: N#CN; carbodiimide isomer: N=C=N

Properties
Chemical formula	CH_{2}N_{2}
Molar mass	42.041 g·mol^{−1}
Appearance	Crystalline solid
Density	1.28 g/cm^{3}
Melting point	44 °C (111 °F; 317 K)
Boiling point	260 °C (500 °F; 533 K) (decomposes); 83 °C at 6.7 Pa; 140 °C at 2.5 kPa
Solubility in water	85 g/100 ml (25 °C)
Solubility in organic solvents	soluble
log P	−0.82
Acidity (pK_{a})	10.3

Hazards
- GHS labelling
Pictograms	(GHS05: Corrosive) (GHS06: Toxic) (GHS07: Exclamation mark) (GHS08: Health hazard)
Signal word	Danger
Hazard statements	H301, H311, H314, H317, H351, H361, H373, H412
Precautionary statements	P201, P202, P260, P264, P270, P272, P273, P280, P281, P301+P310, P301+P330+P331, P302+P352, P303+P361+P353, P304+P340, P305+P351+P338, P308+P313, P310, P312, P314, P321, P322, P330, P333+P313, P361, P363, P405, P501
NFPA 704 (fire diamond)	2 1 2
Flash point	141 °C (286 °F; 414 K)
- NIOSH (US health exposure limits)
PEL (Permissible)	none
REL (Recommended)	TWA 2 mg/m^{3}
IDLH (Immediate danger)	N.D.
Safety data sheet (SDS)	ICSC 0424

Related compounds
Related compounds	Calcium cyanamide
- Except where otherwise noted, data are given for materials in their standard state (at 25 °C [77 °F], 100 kPa). verify (what is ?) Infobox references

Cyanamide is an organic compound with the formula CN_{2}H_{2}. This white solid is widely used in agriculture and the production of pharmaceuticals and other organic compounds. It is also used as an alcohol-deterrent drug. One isomer of the molecule features a nitrile group attached to an amino group. Derivatives of this compound are also referred to as cyanamides, the most common being calcium cyanamide (CaCN_{2}).

== Tautomers and self-condensations ==
Containing both a nucleophilic and electrophilic site within the same molecule, cyanamide undergoes various reactions with itself. Cyanamide exists as two tautomers, one with the connectivity N≡C–NH_{2} and the other with the formula HN=C=NH ("carbodiimide" tautomer). The N≡C–NH_{2} form dominates, but in a few reactions (e.g. silylation) the diimide form appears to be important.

Cyanamide dimerizes to give 2-cyanoguanidine (dicyandiamide). This dimerization is hindered or reversed by acids and is inhibited by low temperatures. The cyclic trimer is called melamine.

== Production ==
Cyanamide is produced by hydrolysis of calcium cyanamide, which in turn is prepared from calcium carbide via the Frank–Caro process.

CaCN_{2} + H_{2}O + CO_{2} → CaCO_{3} + H_{2}NCN

The conversion is conducted on slurries.

== Reactions and uses ==
Cyanamide can be regarded as a functional single carbon fragment which can react as an electrophile or nucleophile. The main reaction exhibited by cyanamide involves additions of compounds containing an acidic proton. Water, hydrogen sulfide, and hydrogen selenide react with cyanamide to give urea, thiourea, and selenourea, respectively:

H_{2}NCN + H_{2}E → H_{2}NC(E)NH_{2} (E = O, S, Se)

In this way, cyanamide behaves as a dehydration agent and thus can induce condensation reactions. Alcohols, thiols, and amines react analogously to give alkylisoureas, isothioureas, and guanidines. The anti-ulcer drug cimetidine is generated using such reactivity. Related reactions exploit the bifunctionality of cyanamide to give heterocycles, and this latter reactivity is the basis of several pharmaceutical syntheses such as the aminopyrimidine imatinib, and agrichemicals Amitrol and hexazinone. The hair-loss treatment minoxidil and the anthelmintics albendazole, flubendazole, and mebendazole feature 2-aminoimidazole substructures derived from cyanamide. Cyanamide is also used in the synthesis of other pharmaceutical drugs including tirapazamine, etravirine, revaprazan, and dasantafil.

The cyanamide anion has the character of a pseudo chalcogen, cyanamide can therefore be regarded as analogue to water or hydrogen sulfide.

A convenient method for the preparation of secondary amines which are not contaminated with primary or tertiary amines is the reaction of cyanamide with alkyl halides to N,N-dialkylcyanamides which can easily be hydrolyzed to dialkylamines and then decarboxylated. Cyanamide adds itself in the presence of N-bromosuccinimide to olefinic double bonds. The addition product is converted by bases to N-Cyanaziridine, cyclized in the presence of acids to imidazolines, which can be further reacted to vicinal diamines by alkaline cleavage.

Cyanamide is also a versatile synthetic building block for heterocycles: it forms 2-aminobenzimidazole with 1,2-diaminobenzene and it forms with the readily available cyclic enamine 4-(1-cyclohexenyl)morpholine and with elemental sulfur a 2-aminothiazole in good yields.

Sodium dicyanamide is available in good yield and high purity from cyanamid and cyanogen chloride, which is suitable as an intermediate for the synthesis of active pharmaceutical ingredients. A guanidino group is introduced by reaction of cyanamide with sarcosine In the industrial synthesis of creatine:.

reaction equation

This synthesis route mostly avoids problematic impurities like chloroacetic acid, iminodiacetic acid, or dihydrotriazine that occur in other routes. The physiological precursor guanidinoacetic is obtained analogously by reacting cyanamide with glycine.

Methods to stabilize cyanamide make it available on an industrial scale. Due to the strong affinity towards self-condensation in alkaline media (see above) solutions of cyanamide are stabilized by the addition of 0.5 wt% of monosodium phosphate as buffer. Solid cyanamide is produced by careful evaporation of the solvent and subsequent addition of a hydrolysis-labile ester of formic acid. The ester absorbs traces of moisture (suppression of urea formation), neutralizes alkalinity (ammonia) and continually releases small amounts of formic acid.

=== Agricultural use ===
Cyanamide, under the trade name Dormex, is a common agricultural rest-breaking agent applied in spring to stimulate uniform opening of buds, early foliation and bloom. Cyanamide can effectively compensate for the moderate lack of chilling units accumulated in the previous autumn and save the harvest that would otherwise be lost. It is particularly effective for woody plants such as blueberries, grapes, apples, peaches and kiwifruit. Most recently the product was approved for use on almonds and pistachios in the USA. Overdosage, high concentration and error in timing of application can damage the buds (especially of peach trees). Growers may avoid damage by applying 30 days prior to bud break according to the label.

A 50% aqueous solution of cyanamide is also used as a biocide (disinfectant) particularly in pig farming, because it effectively kills salmonella and shigella and fights flies in all stages of development.

== Environmental aspects ==
Cyanamide degrades via hydrolysis to urea, an excellent fertilizer. Fungi, like Myrothecium verrucaria, accelerate this process utilizing the enzyme cyanamide hydratase.

== Cyanamide functional group ==
Cyanamide is the name for a functional group with the formula R^{1}R^{2}N−C≡N where R^{1} and R^{2} can be a variety of groups. These compounds are called cyanamides. One example is naphthylcyanamide, C_{10}H_{7}N(CH_{3})CN, which has been produced by the von Braun reaction, a general method for the conversion of tertiary amines to cyanamides using cyanogen bromide as reagent. Alternatively, secondary amines can attack an aryl cyanate to give a carbamimidate; heating then eliminates the arenol to give a cyanamide. A similar reaction occurs with sulfonyl cyanides, but thiocyanates require a thiophilic metal to induce elimination.

Some cyanamides where R^{1} and R^{2} are identical alkyl groups are prepared directly by alkylation of a salt of the parent cyanamide. Likewise, acyl cyanamides can be formed from an acyl chloride and cyanamide, often with a base.

Alternatively, dehydration of ureas or dehydrosulfurization of thioureas can produce cyanamides, sometimes with rearrangement. Isonitrile dichlorides react with ammonia to give cyanamides. As a stabler valence isomer of carbodiimides, cyanamides form when carbodiimides are heated or undergo electrophilic substitution.

Secondary cyanamides are stable, but primary cyanamides trimerize to the corresponding 1,3,5-triazine.

Cyanamides are more acidic and less basic than alkylamines, protonating at the terminal nitrogen. However, nickel(0) complexes are known in which nickel coordinates to both nitrogen atoms. When protonated, the central carbon is very electrophilic, and will add a variety of nucleophiles.

== Cyanamide in space ==
Due to its high permanent dipole moment (i.e., 4.32 ± 0.08 D), cyanamide was detected in spectral emissions coming from the Sgr B2 molecular cloud (T < 100 K) through its microwave transitions as the first known interstellar molecule containing the NCN frame.

== Safety ==
It is used as an alcohol-deterrent drug in Canada, Europe, and Japan.

Cyanamide has a modest toxicity in humans. Workplace exposure to hydrogen cyanamide sprays or exposure in people living in the vicinity of spraying have been reported as causing respiratory irritation, contact dermatitis, headache, and gastrointestinal symptoms of nausea, vomiting, or diarrhea.
