= Ristedt =

- Stadtteil of Klötze
- Interactive map of Ristedt
- Location within Germany Location within Saxony-Anhalt
- Coordinates: 52°38′48″N 11°04′24″E
- Country: Germany
- State: Saxony-Anhalt
- District: Altmarkkreis Salzwedel
- Town: Klötze

Area
  - Total: 8.83 km^{2} (3.41 sq mi)
- Elevation: 49 m (161 ft)

Population (2006-12-31)
  - Total: 241
  - Density: 27.3/km^{2} (70.7/sq mi)
- Time zone: UTC+01:00 (CET)
  - Summer (DST): UTC+02:00 (CEST)
- Postal codes: 38486
- Dialling codes: 03909
- Vehicle registration: SAW

Ristedt is a village and a former municipality in the district Altmarkkreis Salzwedel, in Lower Saxony, Germany. Since 1 January 2010, it is part of the town Klötze.
