= Klötze =

- Town
- Coat of arms

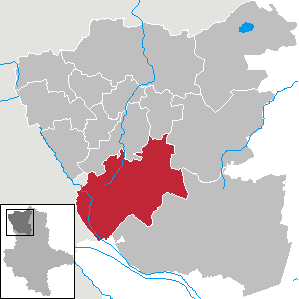
- Location of Klötze within Altmarkkreis Salzwedel district
- Interactive map of Klötze
- Location within Germany Location within Saxony-Anhalt
- Coordinates: 52°37′35″N 11°09′42″E
- Country: Germany
- State: Saxony-Anhalt
- District: Altmarkkreis Salzwedel

Government
  - Mayor (2023–30): Alexander Kleine (SPD)

Area
  - Total: 278.3 km^{2} (107.5 sq mi)
- Elevation: 60 m (200 ft)

Population (2025-12-31)
  - Total: 9,609
  - Density: 34.53/km^{2} (89.43/sq mi)
- Time zone: UTC+01:00 (CET)
  - Summer (DST): UTC+02:00 (CEST)
- Postal codes: 38486, 39638 (Schwiesau)
- Dialling codes: 03909, 039005 (Kusey, Wenze), 039008 (Dönitz, Jahrstedt, Kunrau, Neuferchau, Steimke), 039085 (Schwiesau)
- Vehicle registration: SAW, GA, KLZ
- Website: www.stadt-kloetze.de

Klötze (German pronunciation: [ˈklœtsə]) is a town in the Altmarkkreis Salzwedel (district), in Saxony-Anhalt, Germany. It is situated approximately 20 km northwest of Gardelegen, and 35 km northeast of Wolfsburg.

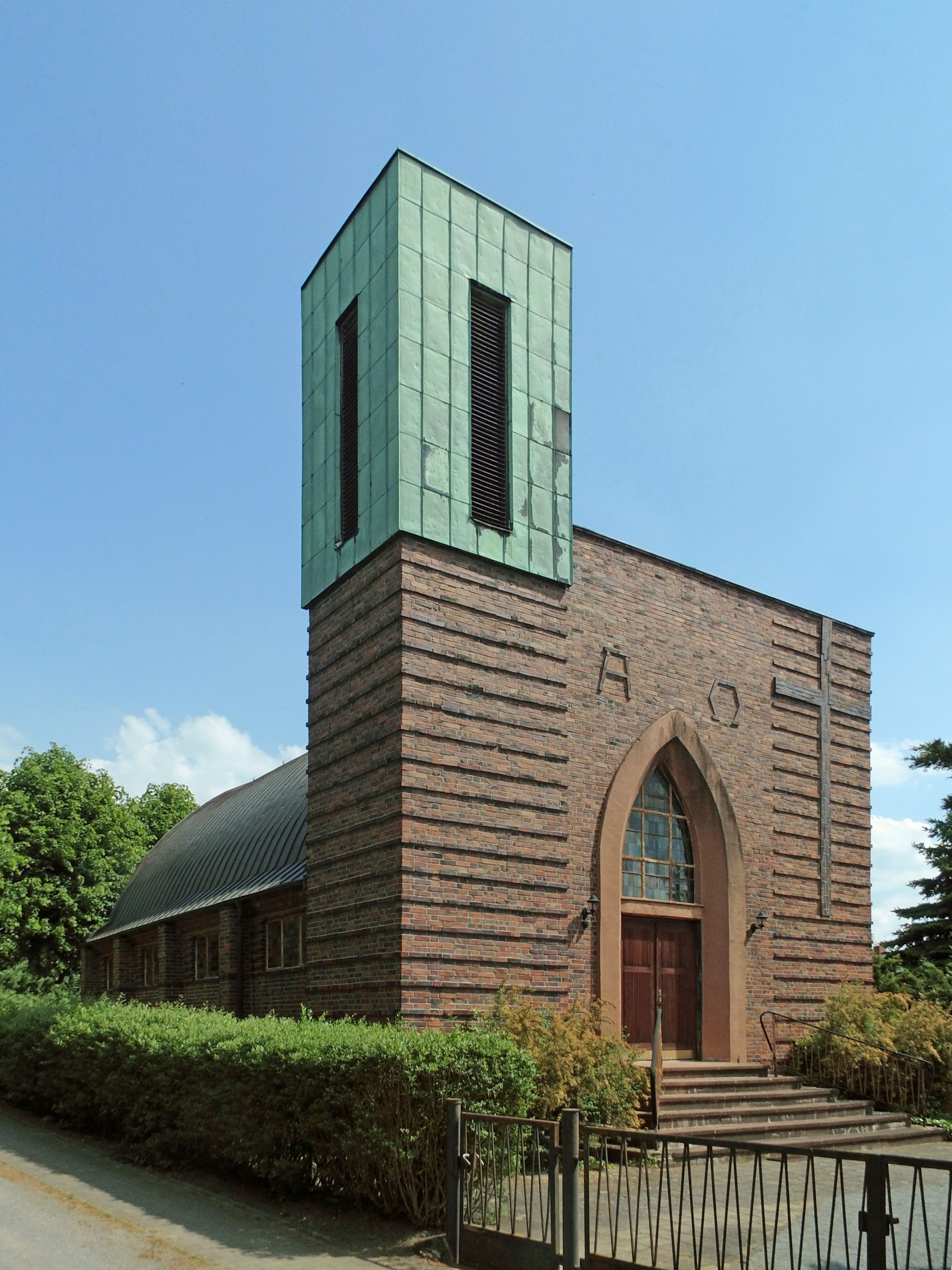
The Catholic Church

== Geography ==
The town Klötze consists of the following Ortschaften or municipal divisions:

- Dönitz
- Immekath
- Jahrstedt
- Klötze
- Kunrau
- Kusey
- Neuendorf
- Neuferchau
- Ristedt
- Schwiesau
- Steimke
- Trippigleben
- Wenze

== History ==
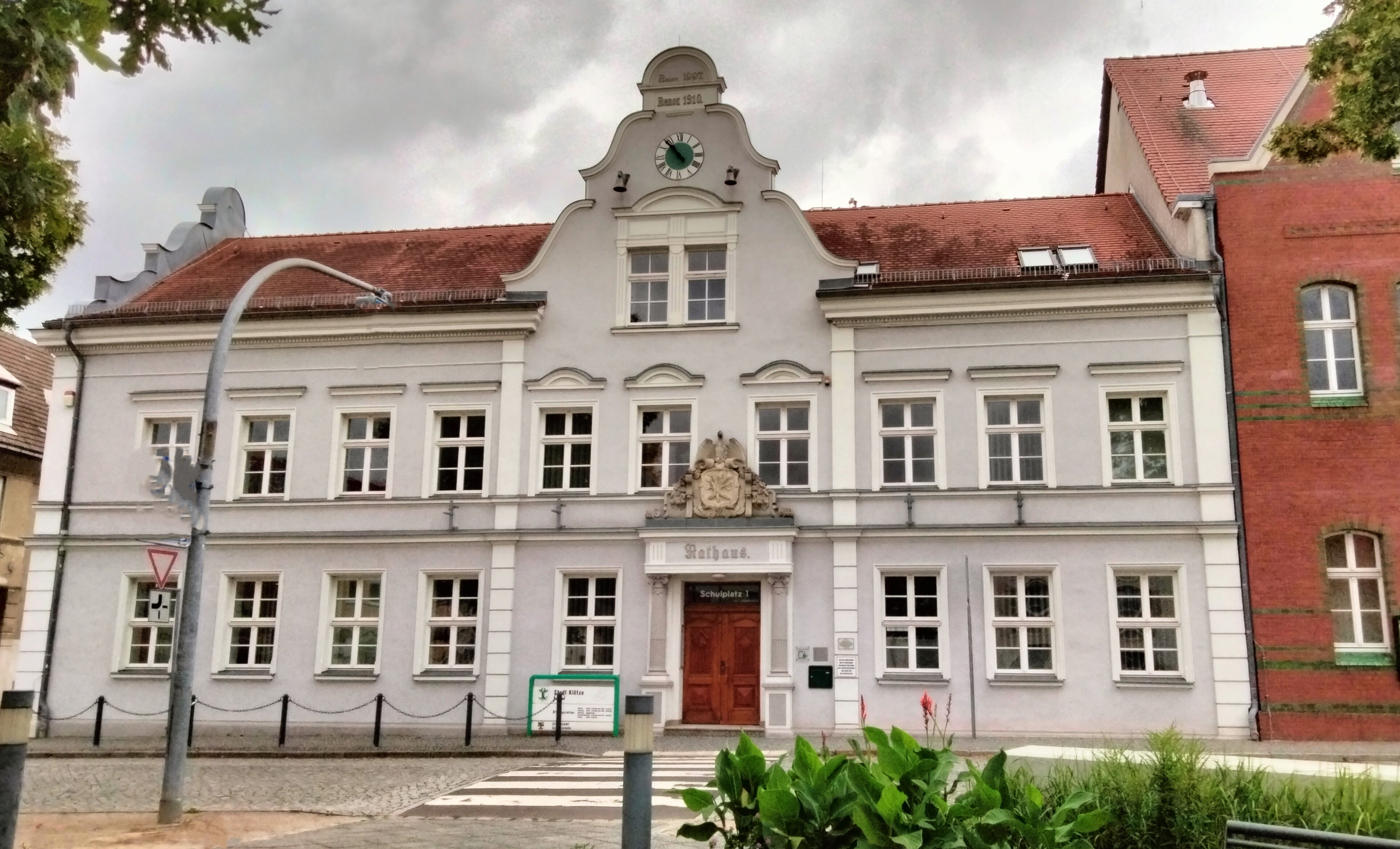
Townhall

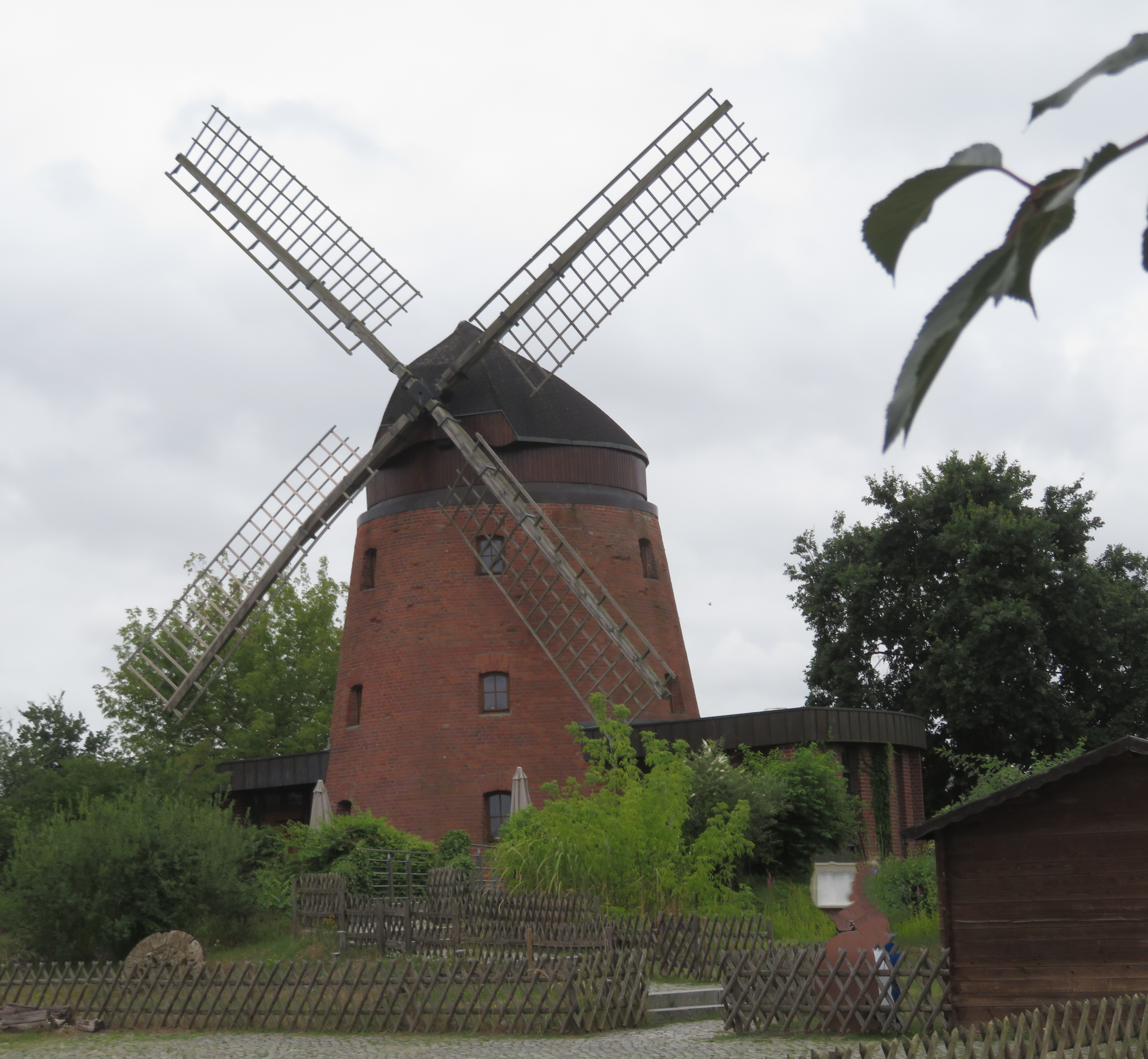
Windmill

Klötze was mentioned first in 1144 with the name Cloetze, which means a wooden block.

In 1846 Klötze attained municipal status, had 2.765 inhabitants in 1855 and 3.199 in 1900. The railway line from Salzwedel to Oebisfelde was inaugurated in 1889 with a railway station in Klötze. The railway line proved to be an important economic factor for the town. In 2001, however, the line was closed.

On 22 February 1945 the town centre was hit by bombs which had missed the railway station and 50 inhabitants lost their lives.

From 1945 to 1990 Klötze was a part of the German Democratic Republic. After the reunification of Germany in 1990, the town faced economic difficulties.

In 2001 Klötze was awarded the official title of a government-approved resort town. In January 2010, with the disbanding of the Verwaltungsgemeinschaft ("collective municipality") of Klötze, the town absorbed 11 former municipalities.

== Sights ==
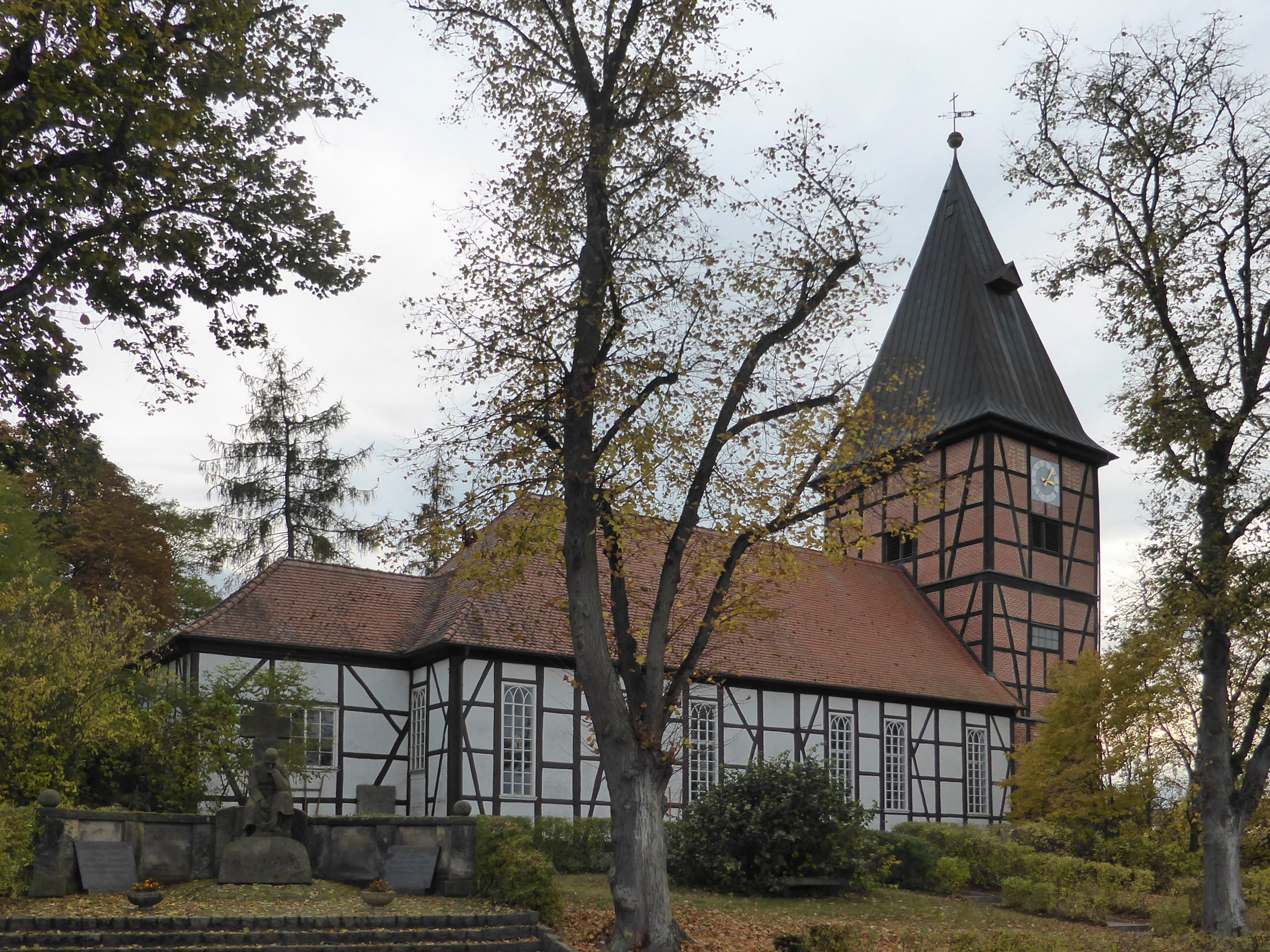
Protestant church

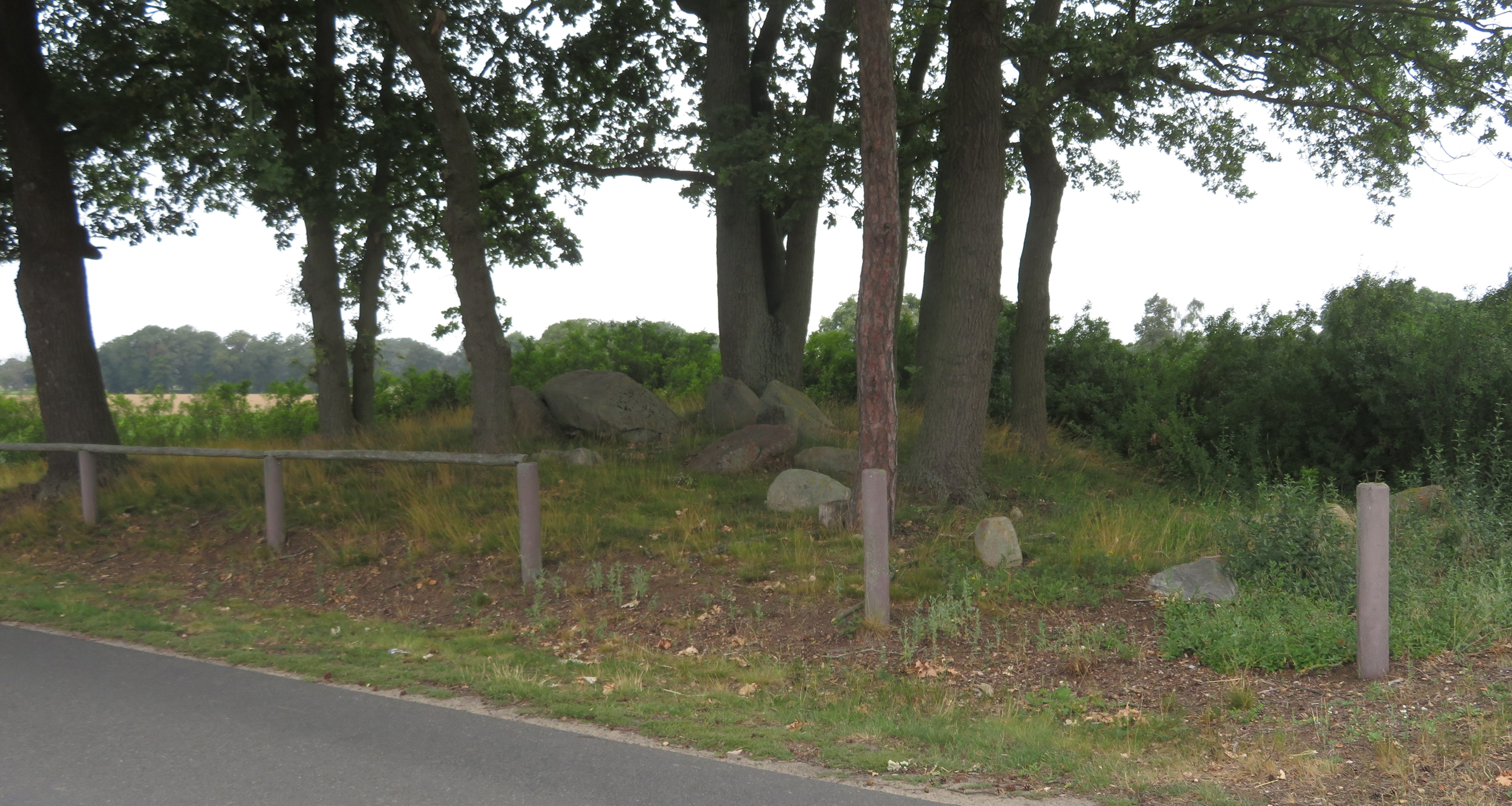
Megalithic grave

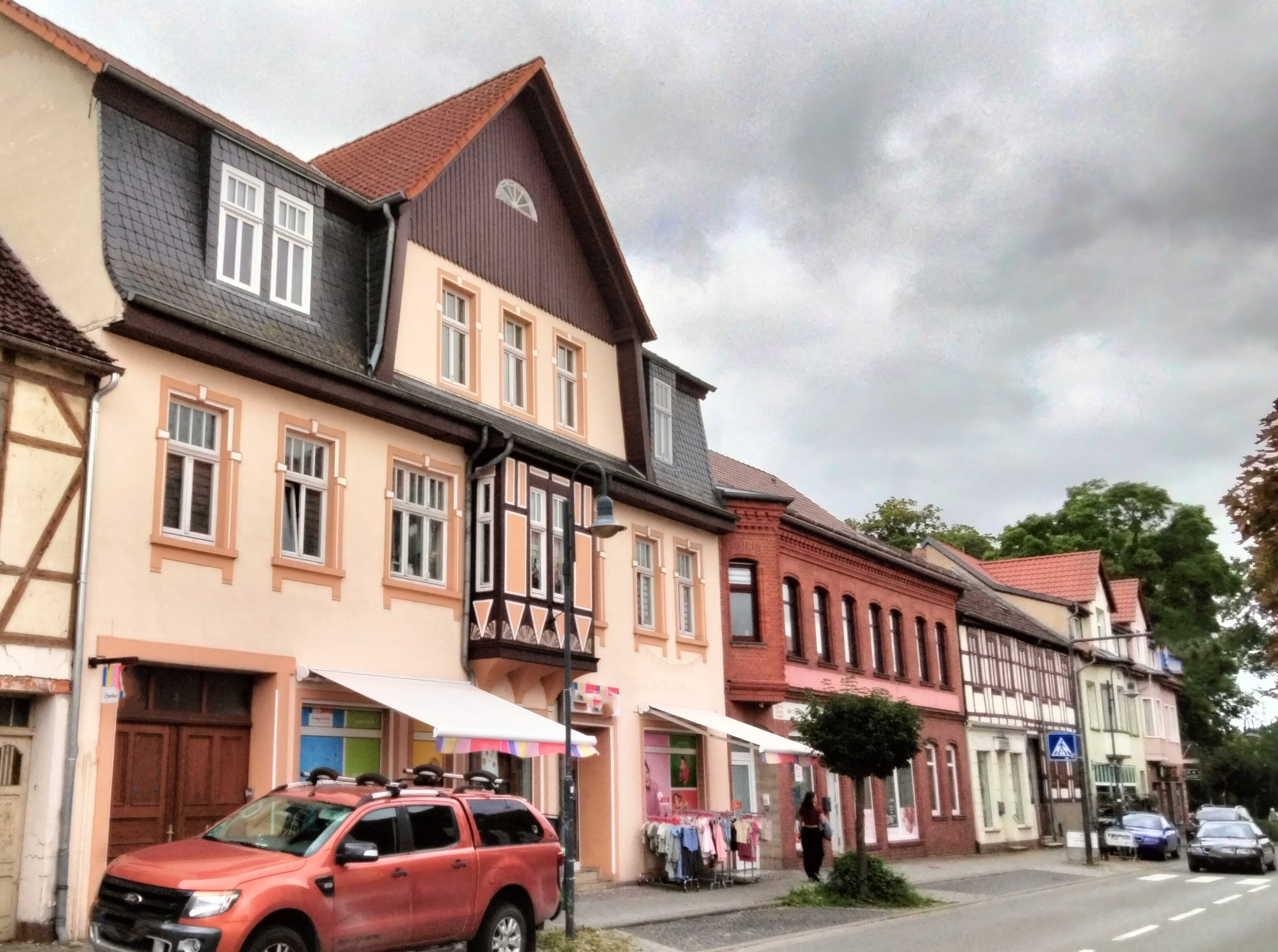
Bahnhofstraße

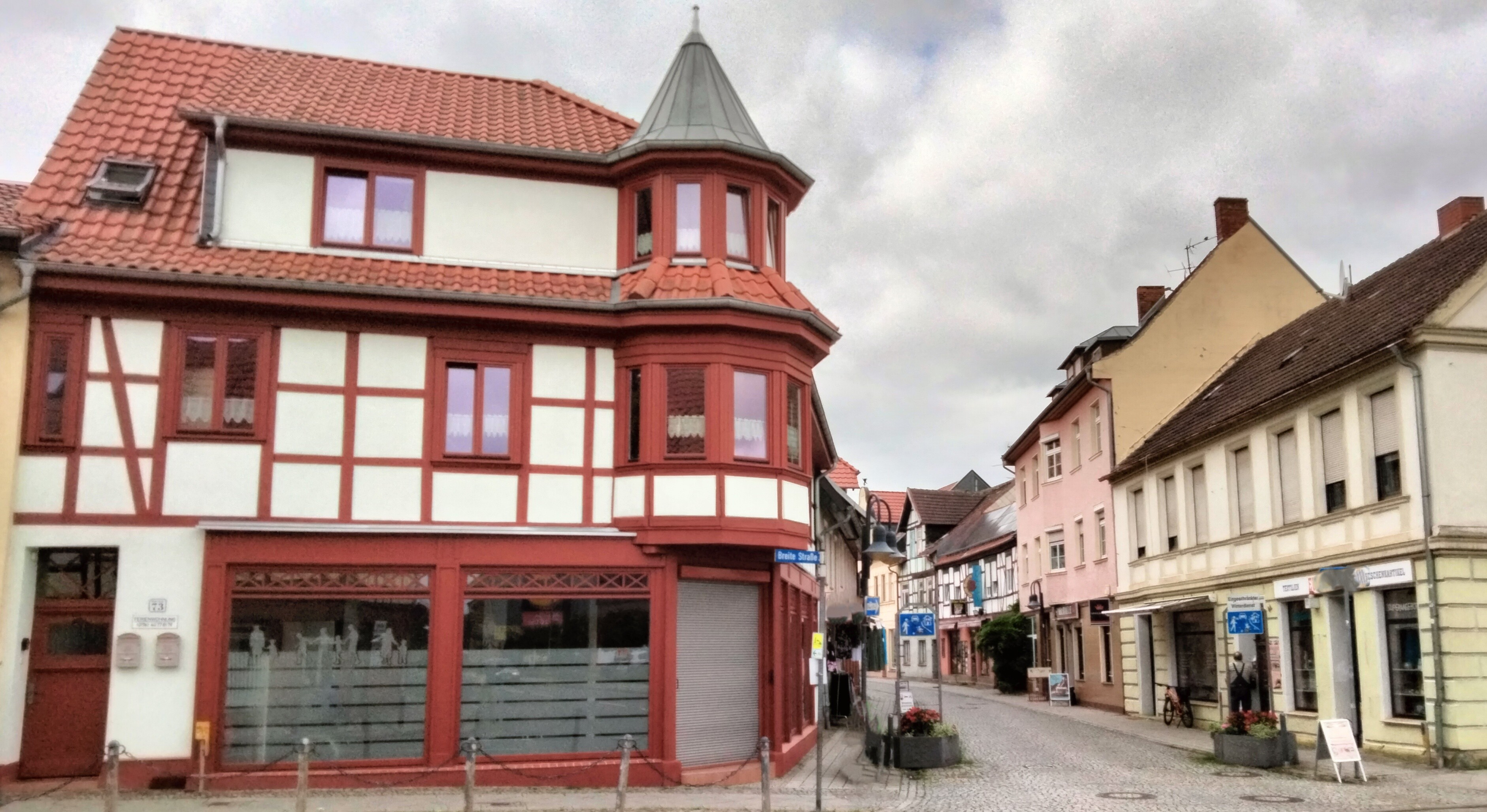
Breite Straße

The townhall dates from 1906. Various half-timbered houses can be seen in Schulstrasse and buildings dating from Gründerzeit are in Bahnhofstrasse, the main street of the town. Various shops and services are in Breite Straße as well. Klötze has also a sightworthy windmill.

The protestant church, St. Ägidienkirche, is a hall church named after Saint Giles. It was built in 1759 in a half-timbered style. The rococo organ dates from 1776.

Saint Joseph's Church, the catholic church of Klötze, was inaugurated in 1930.

On the road to Nesenitz, a village in the northwest of Klötze which was incorporated in 2010, a megalithic grave can be visited.
