= Calcium carbide =

Chemical compound

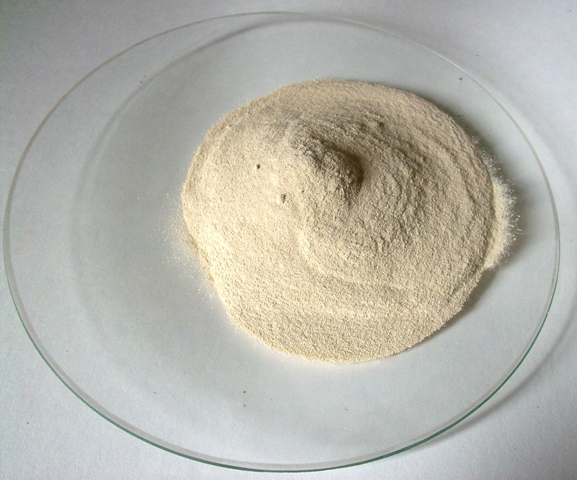

Names
- Preferred IUPAC name Calcium acetylide
- Systematic IUPAC name Calcium ethynediide
- Other names: Calcium percarbide; Calcium carbide; Calcium dicarbide

Identifiers
CAS Number	75-20-7
3D model (JSmol)	Interactive image
ChemSpider	6112
ECHA InfoCard	100.000.772
EC Number	200-848-3
PubChem CID	6352
UNII	846WNV4A5F
CompTox Dashboard (EPA)	DTXSID4026399
- InChI: InChI=1S/C2.Ca/c1-2;/q-2;+2 Key: UIXRSLJINYRGFQ-UHFFFAOYSA-N; InChI=1/C2.Ca/c1-2;/q-2;+2 Key: UIXRSLJINYRGFQ-UHFFFAOYAI
- SMILES: [Ca+2].[C-]#[C-]

Properties
Chemical formula	CaC_{2}
Molar mass	64.100 g·mol^{−1}
Appearance	White powder or colorless crystals, grey/brown/black crystals if impure
Density	2.22 g/cm^{3}
Melting point	2,160 °C (3,920 °F; 2,430 K)
Boiling point	2,300 °C (4,170 °F; 2,570 K)
Solubility in water	Reacts to produce acetylene

Structure
Crystal structure	Tetragonal (I phase); Monoclinic (II phase); Monoclinic (III phase)
Space group	I4/mmm (I phase); C2/c (II phase); C2/m (III phase)
Coordination geometry	6

Thermochemistry
Std molar entropy (S^{⦵}_{298})	70 J/(mol·K)
Std enthalpy of formation (Δ_{f}H^{⦵}_{298})	−63 kJ/mol

Hazards
- Occupational safety and health (OHS/OSH)
Main hazards	Reacts with water to release acetylene gas
- GHS labelling
Pictograms	(GHS02: Flammable) (GHS05: Corrosive)
Signal word	Danger
Hazard statements	H260
NFPA 704 (fire diamond)	1 4 2 W
Autoignition temperature	305 °C (581 °F; 578 K) (acetylene)

Related compounds
Related compounds	Strontium carbide; Barium carbide
- Except where otherwise noted, data are given for materials in their standard state (at 25 °C [77 °F], 100 kPa). verify (what is ?) Infobox references

Calcium carbide, also known as calcium acetylide, is a chemical compound with the chemical formula of CaC_{2}. Its main use industrially is in the production of acetylene and calcium cyanamide.

The pure material is colorless, while pieces of technical-grade calcium carbide are grey or brown and consist of about 80–85% of CaC_{2} (the rest is CaO (calcium oxide), Ca_{3}P_{2} (calcium phosphide), CaS (calcium sulfide), Ca_{3}N_{2} (calcium nitride), SiC (silicon carbide), C (carbon), etc.). In the presence of trace moisture, technical-grade calcium carbide emits an unpleasant odor reminiscent of garlic.

Applications of calcium carbide include manufacture of acetylene gas, generation of acetylene in carbide lamps, manufacture of chemicals for fertilizer, and steelmaking.

== Production ==
Calcium carbide is produced industrially in an electric arc furnace from a mixture of lime and coke at approximately 2,200 °C (3,990 °F). This is an endothermic reaction requiring 110 kilocalories (460 kJ) per mole and high temperatures to drive off the carbon monoxide. This method has not changed since its invention in 1892:

CaO + 3 C → CaC_{2} + CO

The high temperature required for this reaction is not practically achievable by traditional combustion, so the reaction is performed in an electric arc furnace with graphite electrodes. The carbide product produced generally contains around 80% calcium carbide by weight. The carbide is crushed to produce small lumps that can range from a few mm up to 50 mm. The impurities are concentrated in the finer fractions. The CaC_{2} content of the product is assayed by measuring the amount of acetylene produced on hydrolysis. As an example, the British and German standards for the content of the coarser fractions are 295 L/kg and 300 L/kg respectively (at 101 kPa pressure and 20 °C (68 °F) temperature). Impurities present in the carbide include calcium phosphide, which produces phosphine when hydrolysed.

This reaction was an important part of the Industrial Revolution in chemistry, and was made possible in the United States as a result of massive amounts of inexpensive hydroelectric power produced at Niagara Falls before the turn of the 20th century. The electric arc furnace method was discovered in 1892 by T. L. Willson, and independently in the same year by H. Moissan. In Jajce, Bosnia and Herzegovina, the Austrian industrialist Josef Kranz and his "Bosnische-Elektrizitäts AG" company, whose successor later became "Elektro-Bosna", opened the largest chemical factory for the production of calcium carbide at the time in Europe in 1899. A hydroelectric power station on the Pliva river with an installed capacity of 8 MW was constructed to supply electricity for the factory, the first power station of its kind in Southeast Europe, and became operational on 24 March 1899.

== Structure ==
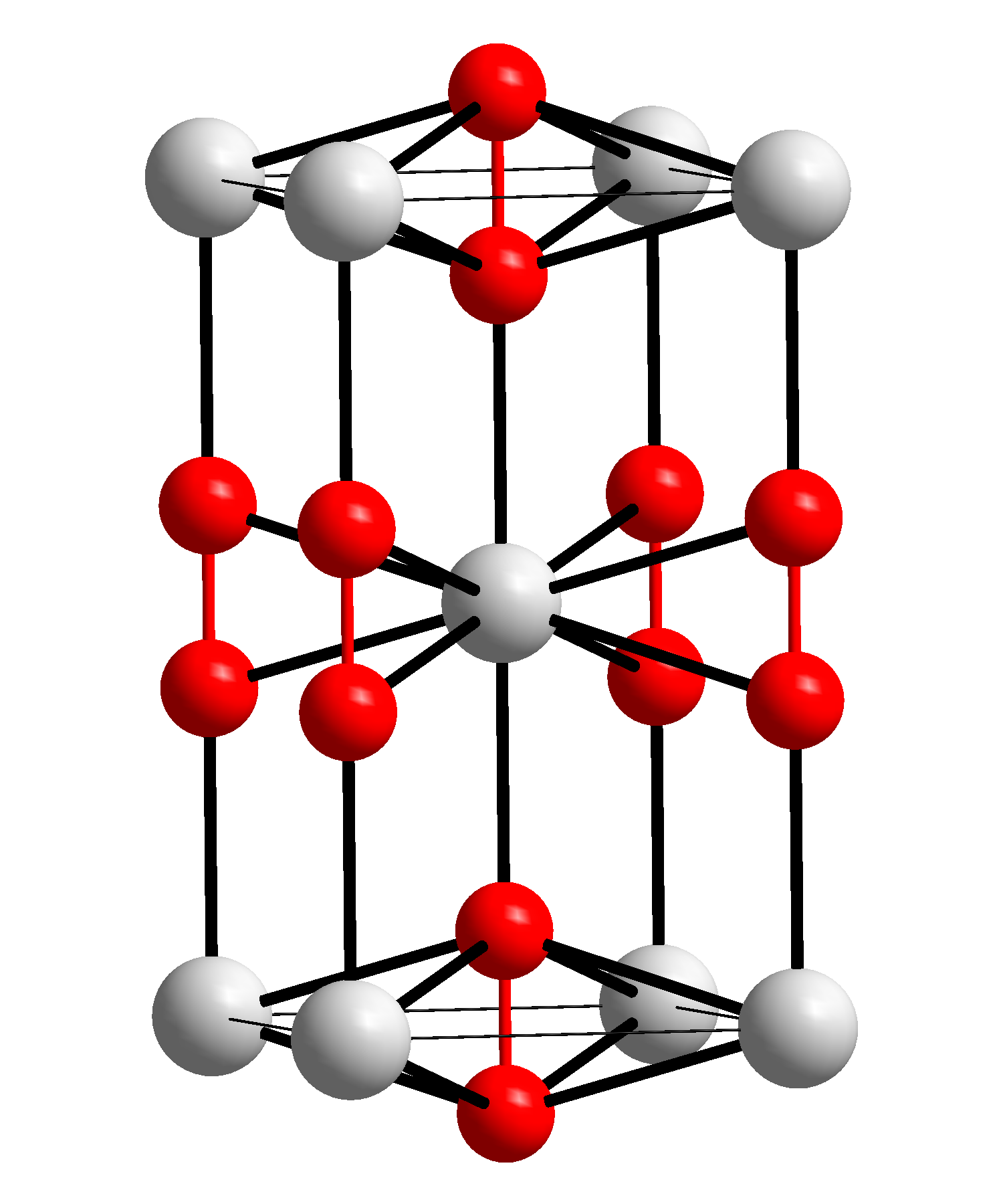
Structure of calcium carbide. Color code: red = C, gray = Ca.

Calcium carbide is a calcium salt of acetylene, consisting of calcium cations Ca^{2+} and acetylide anions ^{−}C≡C^{−}. Pure calcium carbide is a colourless solid. The common crystalline form at room temperature is a distorted rock-salt structure with the C^{2−}_{2} units lying parallel. There are three different polymorphs which appear at room temperature: the tetragonal structure and two different monoclinic structures.

== Applications ==
=== Production of acetylene ===
The reaction of calcium carbide with water, producing acetylene and calcium hydroxide, was discovered by Friedrich Wöhler in 1862.

CaC_{2} + 2 H_{2}O → C_{2}H_{2} + Ca(OH)_{2}

This reaction was the basis of the industrial manufacture of acetylene, and is the major industrial use of calcium carbide.

Today acetylene is mainly manufactured by the partial combustion of methane or appears as a side product in the ethylene stream from cracking of hydrocarbons. Approximately 400,000 tonnes/y are produced by these routes (see acetylene preparation).

In China, acetylene derived from calcium carbide remains a raw material for the chemical industry, in particular for the production of polyvinyl chloride. Locally produced acetylene is more economical than using imported oil. Production of calcium carbide in China has been increasing. In 2005 output was 8.94 million tons, with the capacity to produce 17 million tons.

In the United States, Europe, and Japan, consumption of calcium carbide is generally declining. Production levels in the US during the 1990s were 236,000 tons per year.

=== Production of calcium cyanamide ===
Calcium carbide reacts with nitrogen at high temperature to form calcium cyanamide:

CaC_{2} + N_{2} → CaCN_{2} + C

Commonly known as nitrolime, calcium cyanamide is used as fertilizer. It is hydrolysed to cyanamide, H_{2}N−C≡N.

=== Steelmaking ===
Calcium carbide is used:

- in the desulfurization of iron (pig iron, cast iron and steel)
- as a fuel in steelmaking to extend the scrap ratio to liquid iron, depending on economics.
- as a powerful deoxidizer at ladle treatment facilities.

=== Carbide lamps ===
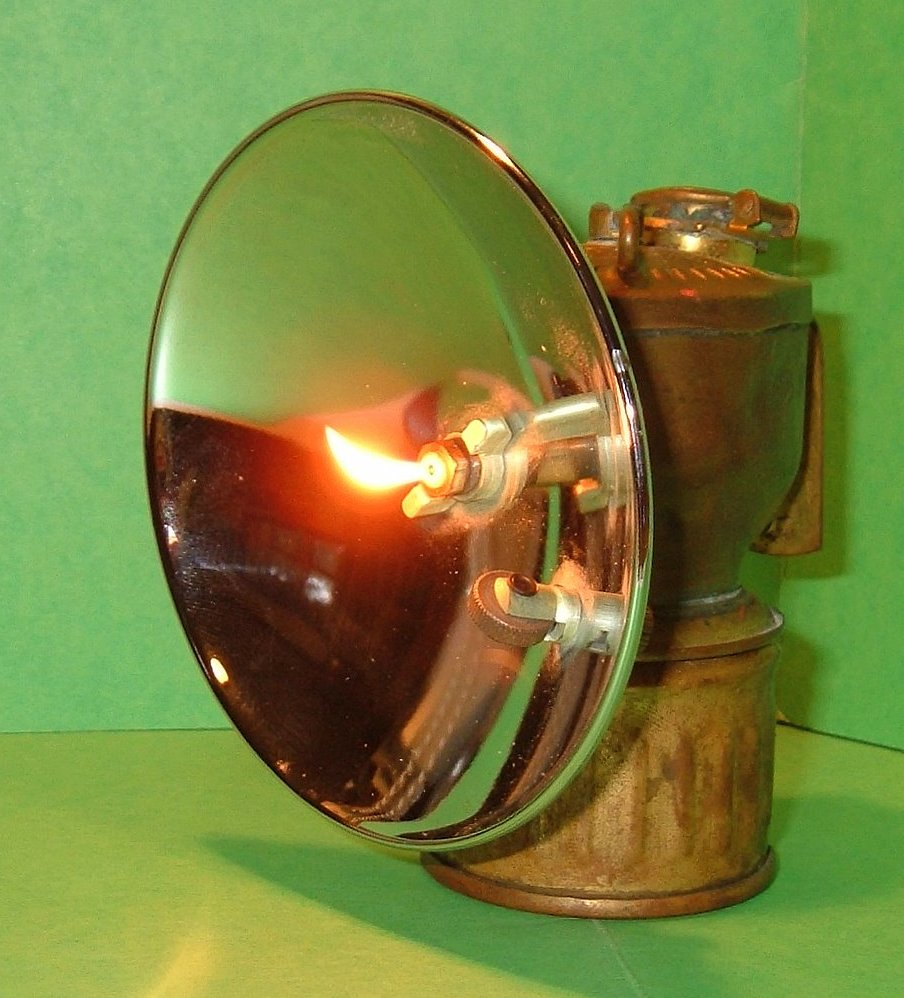
Lit carbide lamp

Calcium carbide is used in carbide lamps. Water dripping on carbide produces acetylene gas, which burns and produces light. While these lamps gave steadier and brighter light than candles, they were dangerous in coal mines, where flammable methane gas made them a serious hazard. The presence of flammable gases in coal mines led to miner safety lamps such as the Davy lamp, in which a wire gauze reduces the risk of methane ignition. Carbide lamps were still used extensively in slate, copper, and tin mines where methane is not a serious hazard. Most miners' lamps have now been replaced by electric lamps.

Carbide lamps are still used for mining in some less wealthy countries, for example in the silver mines near Potosí, Bolivia. Carbide lamps are also still used by some cavers exploring caves and other underground areas, although they are increasingly being replaced in this use by LED lights.

Carbide lamps were also used extensively as headlamps in early automobiles, motorcycles and bicycles, but have been replaced entirely by electric lamps.

=== Other uses ===
Calcium carbide is sometimes used as a ripening agent, somewhat like ethylene gas. This use is illegal in some countries as, in the production of acetylene from calcium carbide, contamination often leads to trace production of phosphine and arsine. In principle, these impurities can be removed by passing the acetylene gas through acidified copper sulfate solution, but, in developing countries, this precaution is often neglected.

Calcium carbide is used in toy cannons such as the Big-Bang Cannon, as well as in bamboo cannons. In the Netherlands, a popular New Year's Eve tradition in rural areas is to use calcium carbide explosions to blow the lid or a ball off the top of a milk churn.

Calcium carbide, together with calcium phosphide, is used in floating, self-igniting naval signal flares, such as those produced by the Holmes' Marine Life Protection Association.

Calcium carbide is used to determine the moisture content of soil. When soil and calcium carbide are mixed in a closed pressure cylinder, the water content in soil reacts with calcium carbide to release acetylene whose pressure can be measured to determine the moisture content.

Calcium carbide is sold commercially as a mole repellent. When it comes into contact with water, the gas produced drives moles away.
