= Frank–Caro process =

Aka cyanamide process: nitrogen fixation reaction of calcium carbide with nitrogen gas

Frank–Caro process Cyanamide process
- Process type: Chemical
- Product(s): calcium cyanamide
- Leading companies: North Western Cyanamide Company
- Main facilities: Odda, Norway
- Year of invention: 1895–1899
- Developer(s): Adolph Frank; Nikodem Caro

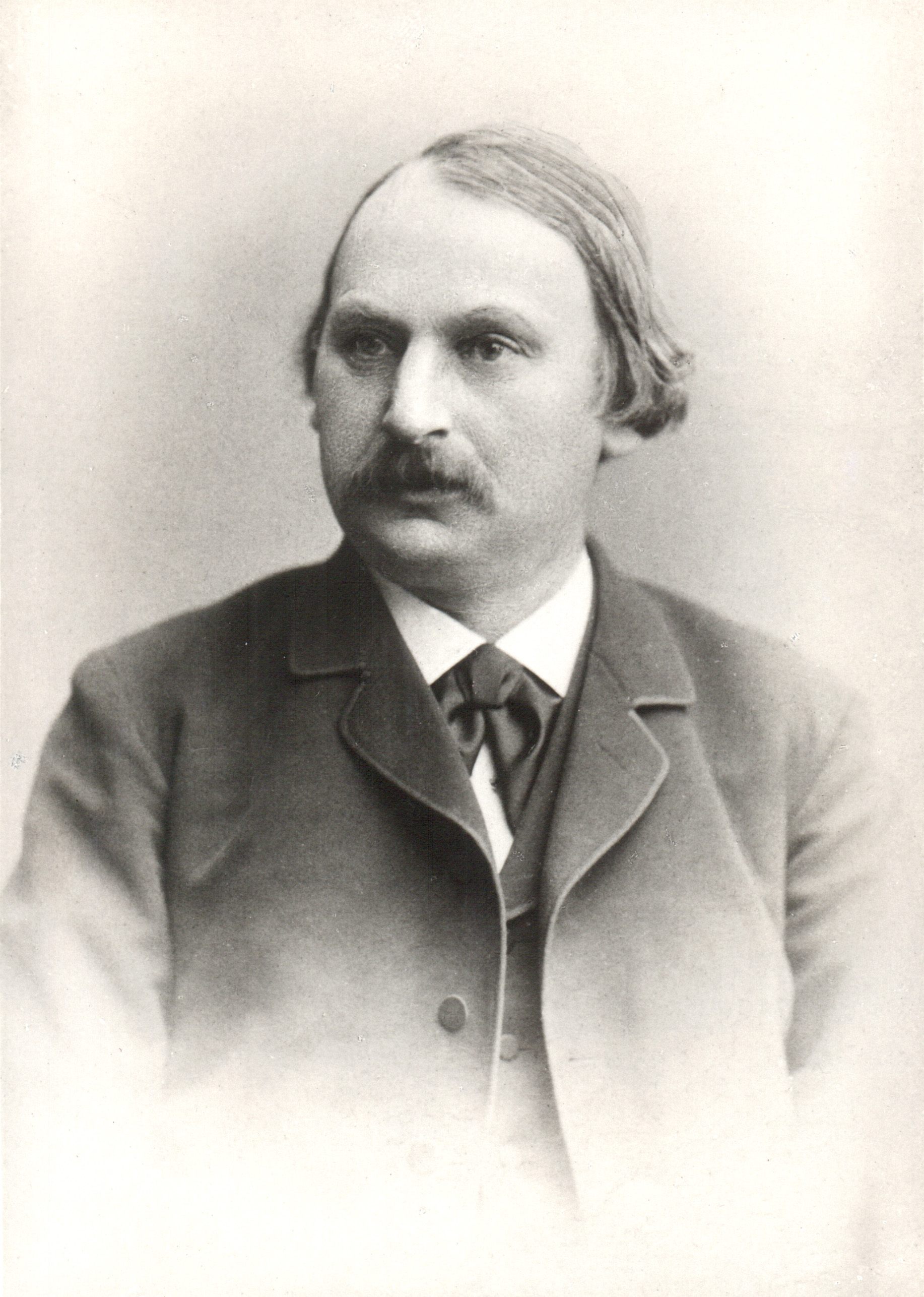
Adolph Frank

The Frank–Caro process, also called cyanamide process, is the nitrogen fixation reaction of calcium carbide with nitrogen gas in a reactor vessel at about 1,000 °C. The reaction is exothermic and self-sustaining once the reaction temperature is reached. Originally the reaction took place in large steel cylinders with an electrical resistance element providing initial heat to start the reaction. Modern production uses rotating ovens. The synthesis produces a solid mixture of calcium cyanamide (CaCN_{2}), also known as nitrolime, and carbon.

CaC_{2} + N_{2} → CaCN_{2} + C

== History ==
The Frank–Caro process was the first commercial process that was used worldwide to fix atmospheric nitrogen. The product was used as fertilizer and commercially known as Lime-Nitrogen. Nitrolim or Kalkstickstoff in German. The method was developed by the German chemists Adolph Frank and Nikodem Caro between 1895 and 1899. In its first decades, the world market for inorganic fertilizer was dominated by factories utilizing the cyanamide process.

=== Production facilities ===
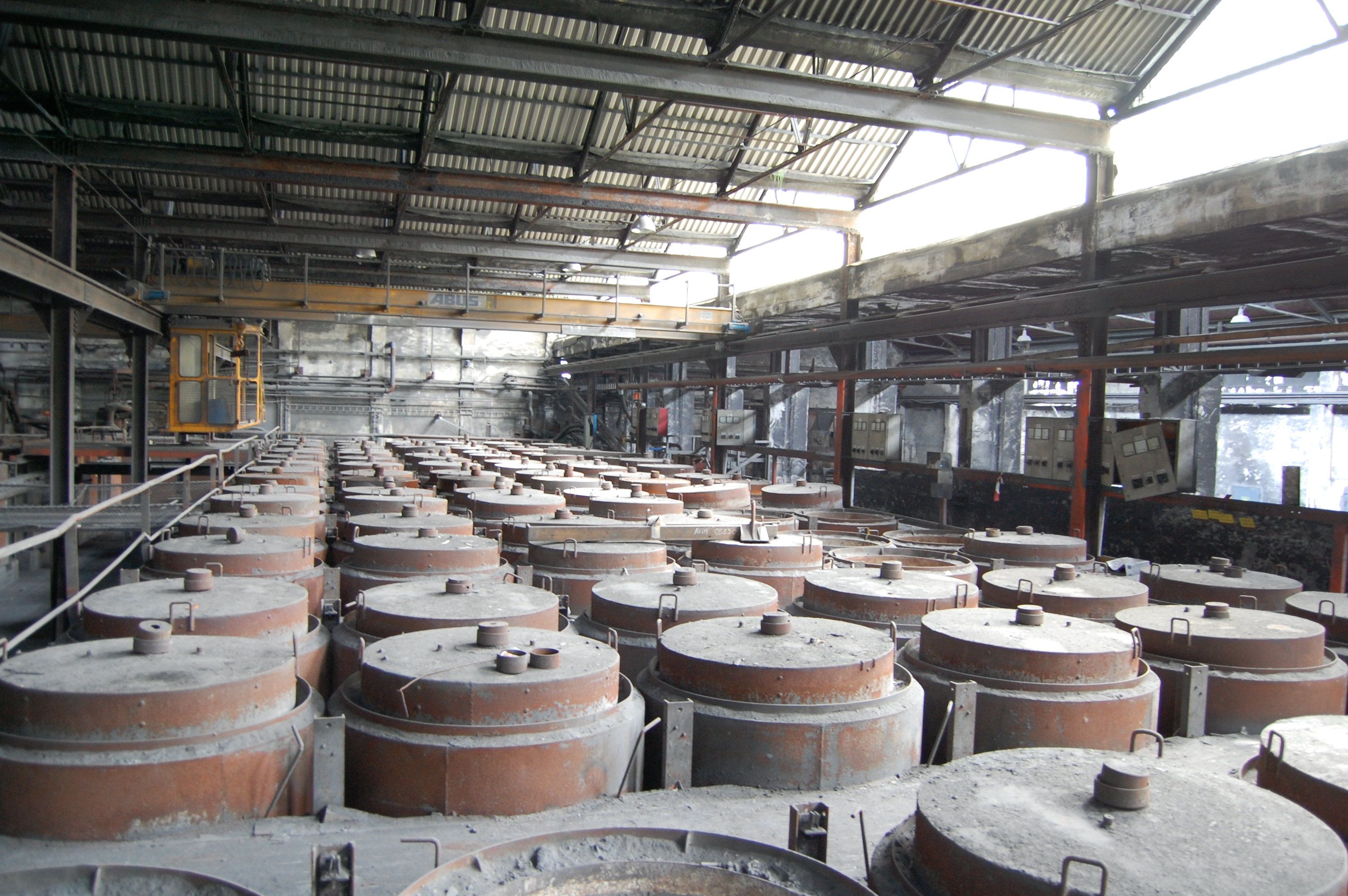
325 Cyanamide kilns from 1934 are preserved at Odda Smelteverk, former North Western Cyanamide Company in Odda, Norway (1908)

The first full-scale factories were established in 1905 in Piano d´Orta (Italy) and Westeregeln (Germany). From 1908 the Frank–Caro process was used at North Western Cyanamide Company at Odda, Norway. With an annual production capacity of 12,000 ton from 1909, the factory at Odda was by far the largest in the world. At this time, first phase factories were established in Briançon (France), Martigny (Switzerland), Bromberg (Prussia/Poland) and Knapsack (Germany). The cyanamide factory at Odda ceased operation in 2002. It is still intact and is a Norwegian candidate to the UNESCO World Heritage List.

=== Haber process ===
In the 1920s the more energy-efficient Haber process gradually took over in the nitrogen fertilizer production, but Frank-Caro process has continued to produce a useful chemical feedstock. In 1945 the production of calcium cyanamide reached a peak of an estimated 1.5 million tons a year.

=== Patent ===
- German patent nr. DE 88363 (1895)

== See also ==
- Odda process
- Birkeland–Eyde process
- Haber–Bosch process
- Linde–Frank–Caro process, a method to produce hydrogen from water gas
