= Calcium cyanamide =

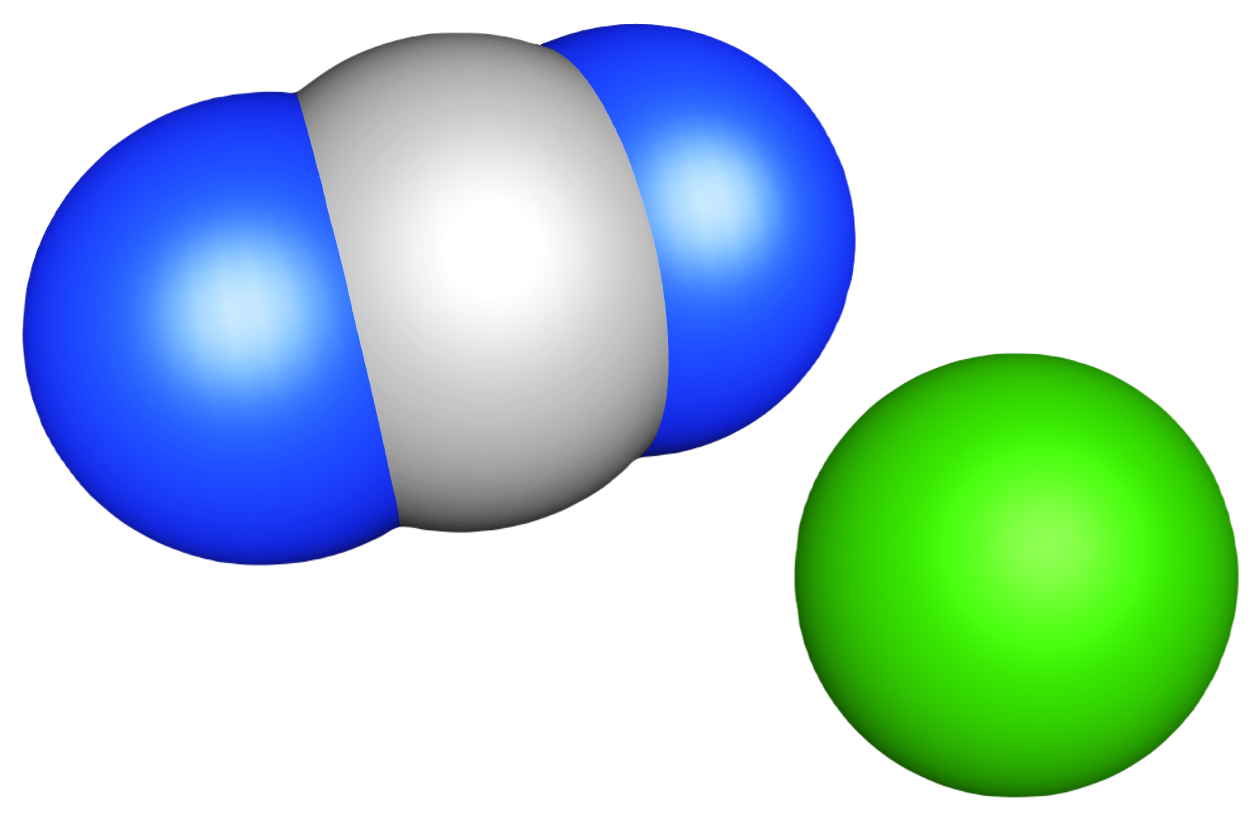

Names
- IUPAC name Calcium cyanamide
- Other names Cyanamide calcium salt, Calcium carbondiamide, Lime Nitrogen, UN 1403, Nitrolime

Identifiers
CAS Number	156-62-7
3D model (JSmol)	Interactive image; Interactive image
ChemSpider	21106503
ECHA InfoCard	100.005.330
EC Number	205-861-8
PubChem CID	45051688
RTECS number	GS6000000
UNII	ZLR270912W
UN number	1403
CompTox Dashboard (EPA)	DTXSID6020353
- InChI: InChI=1S/CN2.Ca/c2-1-3;/q-2;+2 Key: MYFXBBAEXORJNB-UHFFFAOYSA-N; InChI=1/CN2.Ca/c2-1-3;/q-2;+2 Key: MYFXBBAEXORJNB-UHFFFAOYAU
- SMILES: [Ca+2].[N-2]C#N; [Ca+2].[N-]=C=[N-]

Properties
Chemical formula	CaCN_{2}
Molar mass	80.102 g/mol
Appearance	White solid (Often gray or black from impurities)
Odor	odorless
Density	2.29 g/cm^{3}
Melting point	1,340 °C (2,440 °F; 1,610 K)
Boiling point	1,150 to 1,200 °C (2,100 to 2,190 °F; 1,420 to 1,470 K) (sublimes)
Solubility in water	Reacts

Hazards
- GHS labelling
Pictograms	(GHS05: Corrosive) (GHS07: Exclamation mark)
Signal word	Danger
Hazard statements	H302, H318, H335
Precautionary statements	P231+P232, P261, P280, P305+P351+P338
NFPA 704 (fire diamond)	3 0 1 W
Flash point	Non-flammable
- NIOSH (US health exposure limits)
PEL (Permissible)	none
REL (Recommended)	TWA 0.5 mg/m^{3}
IDLH (Immediate danger)	N.D.
Safety data sheet (SDS)	ICSC 1639

Related compounds
Related compounds	Cyanamide; Calcium carbide
- Except where otherwise noted, data are given for materials in their standard state (at 25 °C [77 °F], 100 kPa). verify (what is ?) Infobox references

Calcium cyanamide, also known as Calcium carbondiamide, Calcium cyan-2°-amide or Calcium cyanonitride is the inorganic compound with the formula CaCN_{2}. It is the calcium salt of the cyanamide (CN^{2−}_{2}) anion. This chemical is used as fertilizer and is commercially known as nitrolime. It also has herbicidal activity and in the 1950s was marketed as cyanamid. It was first synthesized in 1898 by Adolph Frank and Nikodem Caro (Frank–Caro process).

== History ==
In their search for a new process for producing cyanides for cyanide leaching of gold, Frank and Caro discovered the ability of alkaline earth carbides to absorb atmospheric nitrogen at high temperatures. Fritz Rothe, a colleague of Frank and Caro, succeeded in 1898 in overcoming problems with the use of calcium carbide and clarified that at around 1,100 °C not calcium cyanide but calcium cyanamide is formed in the reaction. In fact, the initial target product sodium cyanide can also be obtained from calcium cyanamide by melting it with sodium chloride in the presence of carbon:

CaCN_{2} + 2 NaCl + C → 2 NaCN + CaCl_{2}

Frank and Caro developed this reaction for a large-scale, continuous production process. It was particularly challenging to implement because it requires precise control of high temperatures during the initial igniter step; the melting point of calcium cyanamide is only about 120°C lower than the boiling point of sodium chloride.

In 1901, Ferdinand Eduard Polzeniusz patented a process that converts calcium carbide to calcium cyanamide in the presence of 10% calcium chloride at 700 °C. The advantage of this reaction temperature (lower by about 400 °C), however, must be weighed against the large amount of calcium chloride required and the discontinuous process control. Nevertheless, both processes (the Rothe–Frank–Caro process and the Polzeniusz–Krauss process) played a role in the first half of the 20th century. In the record year 1945, a total of approximately 1.5 million tonnes was produced worldwide using both processes. Frank and Caro also noted the formation of ammonia from calcium cyanamide.

CaCN_{2} + 3 H_{2}O → 2 NH_{3} + CaCO_{3}

Albert Frank recognized the fundamental importance of this reaction as a breakthrough in the provision of ammonia from atmospheric nitrogen and in 1901 recommended calcium cyanamide as a nitrogen fertilizer. Between 1908 and 1919, five calcium cyanamide plants with a total capacity of 500,000 tonnes per year were set up in Germany, and one in Switzerland. It was at the time the cheapest nitrogen fertilizer with additional efficacy against weeds and plant pests, and had great advantages over the nitrogen fertilizers that were conventional at the time. However, the large-scale implementation of ammonia synthesis via the Haber process became a serious competitor to the very energy-intensive Frank–Caro process. As urea (formed via the Haber–Bosch process) was significantly more nitrogen-rich (46% nitrogen compared to ca. 20%), cheaper, and faster acting, the role of calcium cyanamide was gradually reduced to a multifunctional nitrogen fertilizer for niche applications. Other reasons for its loss of popularity were its dirty-black color, dusty appearance and irritating properties, as well as its inhibition of an alcohol-degrading enzyme which causes temporary accumulation of acetaldehyde in the body leading to dizziness, nausea, and alcohol flush reaction when alcohol is consumed around the time of bodily exposure.

== Production ==
Calcium cyanamide is prepared from calcium carbide. The carbide powder is heated at about 1000 °C in an electric furnace into which nitrogen is passed for several hours. The product is cooled to ambient temperatures and any unreacted carbide is leached out cautiously with water.

CaC_{2} + N_{2} → CaCN_{2} + C (ΔH^{~~o~~}_{f} = −69.0 kcal/mol at 25 °C)

Calcium cyanamide can also be made by calcining calcium cyanate at 800°C. This process is used by amateur chemists as it can be made from more accessible chemicals (calcium cyanate can be made from urea and calcium oxide via the intermediate cyanuric acid).

It crystallizes in hexagonal crystal system with space group R3m and lattice constants a = 3.67 Å, c = 14.85 Å.

== Uses ==
Soil mediated transformation of calcium cyanamide into plant-available nitrogen forms

The main use of calcium cyanamide is in agriculture as a fertilizer. In contact with water, it hydrolyzes into hydrogen cyanamide which decomposes and liberates ammonia:

CaCN_{2} + 3 H_{2}O → 2 NH_{3} + CaCO_{3}

It was used to produce sodium cyanide by fusing with sodium carbonate:

CaCN_{2} + Na_{2}CO_{3} + 2 C → 2 NaCN + CaO + 2 CO

Sodium cyanide is used in cyanide process in gold mining. It can also be used in the preparation of calcium cyanide and melamine.

Through hydrolysis in the presence of carbon dioxide, calcium cyanamide produces cyanamide:

CaCN_{2} + H_{2}O + CO_{2} → CaCO_{3} + H_{2}NCN

The conversion is conducted in slurries. For this reason, most commercial calcium cyanamide is sold as an aqueous solution.

Thiourea can be produced by the reaction of hydrogen sulfide with calcium cyanamide in the presence of carbon dioxide.

Calcium cyanamide is also used as a steelmaking additive to introduce nitrogen into the steel.

== Safety ==
The substance can cause alcohol intolerance, before or after the consumption of alcohol.
