= Cyanamide hydratase =

cyanamide hydratase

Identifiers
- EC no.: 4.2.1.69
- CAS no.: 50812-20-9

Databases
- IntEnz: IntEnz view
- BRENDA: BRENDA entry
- ExPASy: NiceZyme view
- KEGG: KEGG entry
- MetaCyc: metabolic pathway
- PRIAM: profile
- PDB structures: RCSB PDB PDBe PDBsum
- Gene Ontology: AmiGO / QuickGO
Search
- PMC: articles
- PubMed: articles
- NCBI: proteins

The enzyme cyanamide hydratase (EC 4.2.1.69) catalyzes the chemical reaction

urea $\rightleftharpoons$ cyanamide + H_{2}O

This enzyme belongs to the family of lyases, specifically the hydro-lyases, which cleave carbon-oxygen bonds. The systematic name of this enzyme class is urea hydro-lyase (cyanamide-forming). This enzyme is also called urea hydro-lyase. This enzyme participates in atrazine degradation.
