= History of the Haber process =

The history of the Haber process begins with the invention of the Haber process at the dawn of the twentieth century. The process allows the economical fixation of atmospheric dinitrogen in the form of ammonia, which in turn allows for the industrial synthesis of various explosives and nitrogen fertilizers, and is probably the most important industrial process developed during the twentieth century.

Well before the start of the industrial revolution, farmers would fertilize the land in various ways, mainly using feces and urine, well aware of the benefits of an intake of essential nutrients for plant growth. Although it was frowned upon, farmers took it upon themselves to fertilize their fields using natural means and remedies that had been passed down from generation to generation. The 1840s works of Justus von Liebig identified nitrogen as one of these important nutrients. The same chemical compound could already be converted to nitric acid, the precursor of gunpowder and powerful explosives like TNT and nitroglycerine. Scientists also already knew that nitrogen formed the dominant portion of the atmosphere, but manmade chemistry had yet to establish a means to fix it.

Then, in 1909, German chemist Fritz Haber successfully fixed atmospheric nitrogen in a laboratory. This success had extremely attractive military, industrial and agricultural applications. In 1913, barely five years later, a research team from BASF, led by Carl Bosch, developed the first industrial-scale application of the Haber process, sometimes called the Haber–Bosch process.

The industrial production of nitrogen prolonged World War I by providing Germany with the gunpowder and explosives necessary for the war effort even though it no longer had access to guano. During the interwar period, the lower cost of ammonia extraction from the virtually inexhaustible atmospheric reservoir contributed to the development of intensive agriculture and provided support for worldwide population growth. During World War II, the efforts to industrialize the Haber process benefited greatly from the Bergius process, allowing Nazi Germany access to the synthesized fuel produced by IG Farben, thereby decreasing oil imports.

In the early twenty-first century, the effectiveness of the Haber process (and its analogues) is such that these processes satisfy more than 99% of global demand for synthetic ammonia, a demand which exceeds 100 million tons annually. Nitrogen fertilizers and synthetic products, such as urea and ammonium nitrate, are mainstays of industrial agriculture, and are essential to the nourishment of at least two billion people. Industrial facilities using the Haber process and its analogues have a significant ecological impact. Half of the nitrogen in the great quantities of synthetic fertilizers employed today is not assimilated by plants but finds its way into rivers and the atmosphere as volatile chemical compounds.

== Nitrogen sources pre-Haber process ==
For several centuries, farmers knew that certain nutrients were essential for plant growth. In different parts of the world, farmers developed different methods of fertilizing the farmland. In China, human waste was scattered in rice fields. Justus von Liebig (1803 – 1873), German chemist and founder of industrial agriculture, claimed that England had "stolen" 3.5 million skeletons from Europe to obtain phosphorus for fertilizer. In Paris, as many as one million tons of horse dung was collected annually to fertilize city gardens. Throughout the nineteenth century, bison bones from the American West were brought back to East Coast factories for the production of phosphorus and phosphate fertilizer.

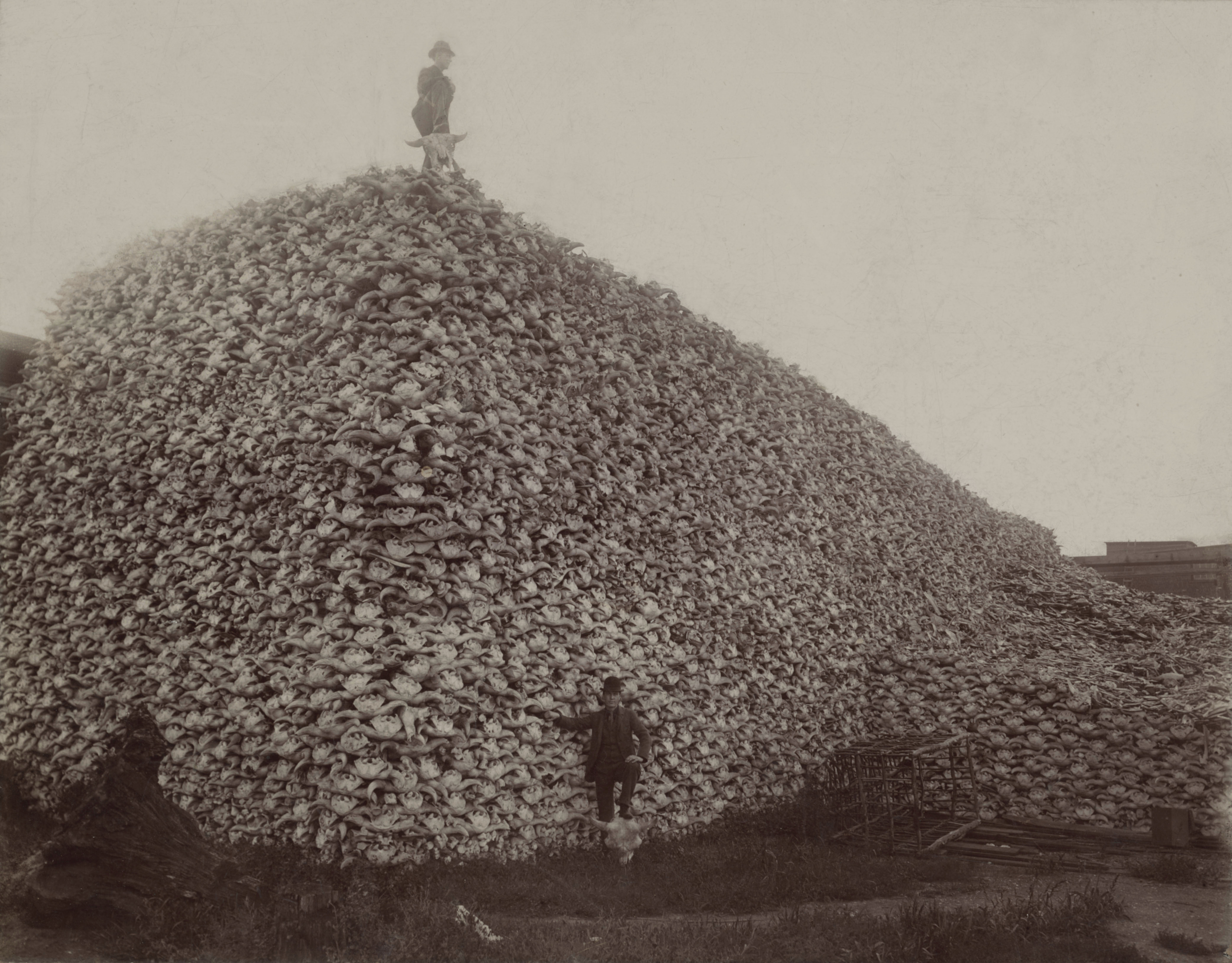
Pile of bison skulls Photo taken in the 1870s in the U.S.

From the 1820s to the 1860s, the Chincha Islands of Peru were exploited for their high quality guano deposits, which they exported to the United States, France and the United Kingdom. The guano-boom increased economic activity in Peru considerably for a few decades until all 12.5 million tons of guano deposits were exhausted.

Research was initiated to find alternative sources of fertilizer. The Atacama Desert, at that time part of Peru, was home to significant amounts of saltpeter (sodium nitrate). At the time of the discovery of these deposits, the saltpeter had limited agricultural use. Then chemists successfully developed a process to purify the saltpeter in order to produce gunpowder. The saltpeter was also converted into nitric acid, the precursor of powerful explosives, such as nitroglycerine and dynamite. As exports from this region increased, tensions between Peru and its neighbors increased as well.

In 1879, Bolivia, Chile, and Peru went to war over possession of Atacama Desert, the so-called "Saltpeter War". Bolivian forces were quickly defeated by the Chileans. In 1881, Chile defeated Peru and seized control of nitrate exploitation in the Atacama Desert. Consumption of Chilean saltpeter for agriculture quickly grew and Chileans standard of living rose significantly.

Technological developments in Europe brought an end to these days. In the twentieth century, the minerals from this region "contribute[d] minimally to global nitrogen supply."

== A pressing need ==
In the late nineteenth century, chemists, including William Crookes, President of the British Association for the Advancement of Science in 1898, predicted that the demand for nitrogen compounds, either in the form of fertilizer or explosives, would exceed supply in the near future.

Following the work by Claude Louis Berthollet published in 1784, chemists knew ammonia to be a nitrogen compound. Early attempts to synthesize ammonia were performed in 1795 by Georg Friedrich Hildebrandt. Several others were made during the nineteenth century.

In the 1870s, ammonia was an unwanted byproduct of making manufactured gas. Its importance emerged later, and in the 1900s the industry modified their facilities to produce it from coke. Still, production could not meet demand.

In 1900, Chile, with its deposits of saltpeter, produced two-thirds of all fertilizer on the planet. However, these deposits rapidly diminished, the industry was dominated by an oligopoly and the cost of saltpeter rose constantly. To ensure food security for Europe's growing population, it was essential that a new economical and reliable method of obtaining ammonia be developed.

Issues of food security were particularly acute in Germany. Its soil was poor and the country lacked an empire. A major consumer of Chilean saltpeter, Germany saltpeter imports totaled 350,000 tonnes in 1900. Twelve years later, it imported 900,000 tonnes. The United States was in much better position due to the Guano Islands Act.

In the years between 1890 and 1900, chemistry advanced on several fronts, and more scientists attempted to fix atmospheric nitrogen. In 1895, German chemists Adolf Frank and Nikodem Caro succeeded in reacting calcium carbide with dinitrogen to obtain calcium cyanamide, a chemical compound used as a fertilizer. Industrialization of the Frank-Caro process began in 1905. By 1918, there were 35 synthesis sites fixing 325,000 tonnes of nitrogen annually. However, the Cyanamide process consumed large amounts of electrical power and was more labor-intensive than the Haber process. Today, cyanamide is used primarily as a herbicide.

Wilhelm Ostwald, considered one of the best German chemists of the early twentieth century, attempted to synthesize ammonia in 1900 using an invention. He interested BASF, who asked Carl Bosch, a recently hired chemist, to validate the device.

In 1901, Henry Le Chatelier managed to synthesize ammonia from air. After obtaining a patent, he claimed it was possible to obtain better performance by increasing the pressure. When one of his assistants was killed following the accidental explosion of a device, Le Chatelier decided to end his research.

In 1905, Norwegian physicist Kristian Birkeland, funded by engineer and industrialist Samuel Eyde, developed the Birkeland–Eyde process which fixes atmospheric nitrogen as nitrogen oxides. The Birkeland–Eyde process requires a considerable amount of electricity, constraining possible site location; fortunately, Norway possessed several sites capable of meeting these needs. Norsk Hydro was founded 2 December 1905 to commercialize the new process. In 1911, the Norsk Hydro facility was consuming 50,000 kW, the next year, consumption doubled to 100,000 kW. By 1913, Norsk Hydro's facilities were producing 12,000 tonnes of nitrogen, about 5 percent of the volume extracted from coke at the time.

Similar processes were developed at the time. Schönherr, an employee of BASF, worked on a nitrogen fixation process beginning in 1905. In 1919, Schönherr's Badische process was employed at Norsk Hydro facilities. That same year, the Pauling process was used in Germany and the United States.

All these methods were quickly supplanted by the less-expensive Haber process.

== A new approach ==
In 1905, German chemist Fritz Haber published Thermodynamik technischer Gasreaktionen (The Thermodynamics of Technical Gas Reactions), a book more concerned about the industrial application of chemistry than to its theoretical study. In it, Haber inserted the results of his study of the equilibrium equation of ammonia:

N_{2} (g) + 3 H_{2} (g) ⇌ 2 NH_{3} (g) - ΔH

At 1000 °C in the presence of an iron catalyst, "small" amounts of ammonia were produced from dinitrogen and dihydrogen gas. These results discouraged his further pursuit in this direction. However, in 1907, spurred by a scientific rivalry between Haber and Walther Nernst, nitrogen fixation became Haber's first priority. A few years later, Haber used results published by Nernst on the chemical equilibrium of ammonia and his own familiarity with high pressure chemistry and the liquefaction of air, to develop a new nitrogen fixation process. He had no precise information on the parameters to impose on the system, but at the conclusion of his research, he was able to establish that an effective ammonia production system must:

- operate at high pressure (on the order of 20 MPa);
- implement one or more catalysts to accelerate the synthesis of ammonia;
- operate at a high temperature (between 500 °C and 600 °C) to obtain the best efficiency in the presence of the catalyst;
- since about 5% of the N_{2} and H_{2} molecules react with each passage in the chemical reactor:
  - separate the ammonia from the other molecules by liquefaction,
  - withdraw ammonia continuously,
  - inject the N_{2} and H_{2} that did not react into the chemical reactor again;
- recycle the heat produced.

To overcome the problems associated with high pressure, Haber called upon the talents of Robert Le Rossignol, who designed the equipment necessary for the success of the process. Early in 1909, Haber discovered that osmium could serve as a catalyst. Later, he established that uranium could also act as a catalyst. Haber also obtained good results with iron, nickel, manganese and calcium. In the chemical equation shown above, the direct reaction is exothermic. This heat can be used to heat the reagents before they enter the chemical reactor. Haber's team developed a system that recycles the heat produced.

In March 1909, Haber demonstrated to his laboratory colleagues that he had finally found a process capable of fixing atmospheric dinitrogen sufficient to consider its industrialization.

While BASF took out a patent on the Haber process, August Bernthsen, director of research at BASF, doubted the utility of it. He did not believe that BASF wanted to engage in such a project. According to Bernthsen, no industrial device was capable of withstanding such high pressure and temperature for a long enough period to pay off the investment. In addition, it appeared to him that the catalytic potential of osmium could disappear with use, which required its regular replacement despite the metal being scarce on Earth.

However, Carl Engler, a chemist and university professor, wrote to BASF President Heinrich von Brunck to convince him to talk to Haber. Von Brunck, along with Bernthsen and Carl Bosch, went to Haber's laboratory to determine whether BASF should engage in industrialization of the process. When Bernthsen learned that he needed devices capable of supporting at least 100 atm (about 10 MPa), he exclaimed, "One hundred atmospheres! Just yesterday an autoclave at seven atmospheres exploded on us!" Before deciding, von Brunck asked for Bosch's advice.

The latter had already worked in metallurgy, and his father had installed a mechanical workshop at home where the young Carl had learned to handle different tools. He had been working for several years on nitrogen fixation, without having obtained any significant results. He knew that processes that used electric arc furnaces, such as the Birkeland–Eyde process, required huge amounts of electricity, making them economically nonviable outside Norway. To continue to grow, BASF had to find a more economical method of fixing. Bosch said, "I think it can work. I know exactly what the steel industry can do. We should risk it."

In July 1909, BASF employees came to check on Haber's success again: the laboratory equipment fixed the nitrogen from the air, in the form of liquid ammonia, at a rate of about 250 milliliters every two hours. BASF decided to industrialize the process, although it was associated with Norsk Hydro to operate the Schönherr process. Carl Bosch, future head of industrialization of the process, reported that the key factor that prompted BASF to embark on this path was the improvement of the efficiency of the catalyst.

== A new field of knowledge ==
At the time, high-pressure chemistry was a new field of knowledge, making its industrialisation all the more difficult. However, BASF had developed an industrial process for synthesizing indigo dye. This development took 15 years of work, but paid off, as this process made BASF an industrial giant.

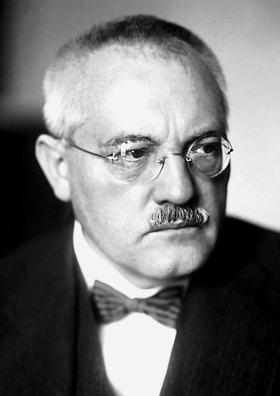
Photograph of Carl Bosch published by the Nobel Foundation around 1931, but taken around the end of the 1920's.

In his speech before accepting his Nobel prize in chemistry in 1931, Carl Bosch claimed that, before ammonia could be synthesized industrially, three major obstacles needed to be overcome:

1. Obtain hydrogen and nitrogen gas at a lower cost than what was commonly available at the time,
2. Manufacture efficient and stable catalysts,
3. Building the apparatus.

=== A satisfactory gas mixture ===
At the time Bosch began the development of this industrial process in 1909, it was possible to obtain a sufficiently pure gas mixture of hydrogen and nitrogen in the right proportions. However, there was no source capable of supplying an industrial plant at sufficiently low cost. Developing an economical source was essential as, according to Bosch, the cost of ammonia production was mostly dependent on the cost of hydrogen.

Bosch and his colleagues succeeded in developing a catalytic chemical process cable of supplying hydrogen to BASF's facilities, consequently providing a substitute to the chlor-alkali process. In the 21st century, the bulk of required hydrogen is produced from methane using heterogeneous catalysts, which requires considerably less energy than other methods.

=== A stable and inexpensive catalyst ===
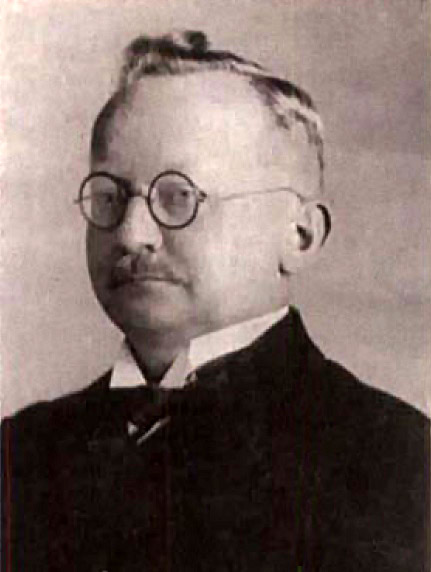
Alwin Mittasch, 1902

When the industrialisation project started, Bosch rejected osmium as a catalyst, due its rarity. He also rejected uranium because it easily reacts with oxygen and water, both present in air

Bosch assigned Alwin Mittasch to search for a stable and inexpensive catalyst. Together with his colleagues, they studied practically all the elements of the periodic table to find the best catalyst. In September 1909, they discovered an iron-based compound that exhibited interesting properties. The impurities in the compound had a catalytic effect, but Mittasch did not know the exact arrangement. After two years of work, they discovered a catalyst, also iron-based, significantly less expensive and more stable than osmium. When he stopped his search for an ideal catalyst in 1920, Mittasch estimated that he had tested about 20,000 compounds. His efforts ushered in a new era in chemistry: chemists recognized the importance of promoters, impurities that increase the catalytic effect tenfold.

According to Bosch, all iron-based catalysts used in 1931 were used in ammonia synthesis. He also mentioned that molybdenum had excellent catalytic properties.

=== New apparatus ===
Bosch's team also had to conceive industrial apparatus capable of working under the new conditions of the time: pressures of the order of 20 MPa and temperatures in the order of 600 °C. According to Bosch, there was no other equivalent in industry (Linde's liquefaction process, of physical nature, was the closest thing). To meet their needs, they had to set up a manufacturing workshop from scratch. Bosch and his colleagues replicated Haber's prototype to conduct their experiments. This apparatus could not operate on an industrial scale. They conceived new devices, and 24 of these were put into continuous operation for years.

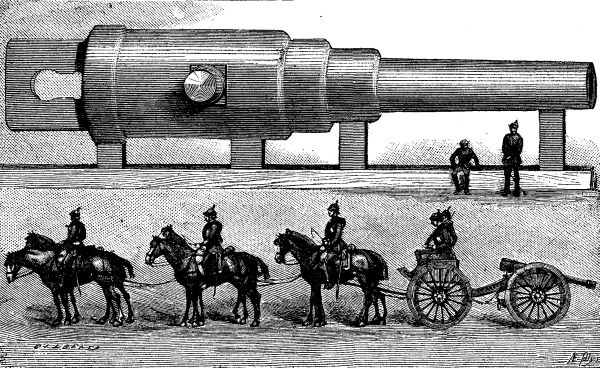
Drawing of a cannon built by Krupp in the 1880s as published by Scientific American in 1887

When Bosch believed his team had gained sufficient experience with benchtop devices, he had two larger chemical reactors built. Each was 2.44 meters high and had a wall thickness exceeding 2.5 centimeters. These cylinders were built by the best German gun manufacturer of the time: Krupp.

During their experiments, they discovered that the supposedly strong alloys lost their elasticity under these operating conditions. Bosch spontaneously believed that chemical corrosion caused by nitrogen was responsible for this phenomenon. To confirm his suspicions, he used a novelty in the industrial setting of the time: metallographic analysis. It revealed that hydrogen at high pressure and temperature was responsible: it penetrated the steel walls of the reactor and weakened them by forming a new alloy.

They attempted to solve this problem by reducing the temperature of the reactor, but the catalyst only worked at temperatures above 400 °C. They covered the inner reactor walls with thermal insulators, but hydrogen diffused easily through these materials, and, is an excellent thermal conductor at high pressures. They also tried various steels that were commercially available at the time, without success.

The program was in jeopardy, and six months after the problem first appeared, there were still no viable and permanent solutions. Finally, it was Bosch that found one: separating the two functions offered by the reactor shell. The reactor shell serves to (1) maintain internal pressure, and (2) prevent the diffusion of the gaseous mixture outside of the reactor. A reactor with two walls, nested together like Russian dolls, makes it possible to separate both functions. Hydrogen diffuses across the inner walls and sees its pressure greatly reduced on the other side, where it is much less likely to corrode the interior shell. To facilitate the flow of hydrogen, the exterior walls are engraved with small gutters on their inner faces. On the other hand, it was possible for hydrogen to accumulate between the two walls. Bosch wondered how to prevent the risk of explosions caused by such pockets. The solution came to him when he realized that hydrogen could escape through the outside walls without significantly reducing the pressure in the reactor. He had small holes drilled in the outer surface. Bosch claimed that this solution was still in use in 1931. It was also possible to reduce corrosion by circulating nitrogen gas between the two walls.

Several members of Bosch's team were veterans of the era where BASF had created various dye synthesis processes, including indigo. They knew that the development of an industrial process could take years, and so were not particularly disappointed when problems arose. However, the program moved forward regularly, which maintained the morale of the employees.

At the time, there was no industrial pump capable of delivering pressures in the order of 20 MPa. Linde's liquefaction process, for example, used air pumps, but they were too small. Additionally, air leaks were tolerated. In the Haber-Bosch process, hydrogen leaks were not permissible due to the risk of explosion. Additionally, any leaks increase the cost of ammonia production. After several years of work, employees under Bosch's orders managed to put into operation sealed pumps of about 2240 kW that could operate continuously for 6 months before requiring maintenance, something that had not yet been achieved.

While Bosch and his team experimented to create new apparatus, some exploded under pressure. They would then perform an "autopsy" of the debris to determine what had caused the rupture. This allowed them to design stronger, more reliable devices. To maintain the physical integrity of the production devices, the production system had to be quickly halted in the case of breakage. They developed a set of instruments designed to continuously monitor the evolution of chemical reactions, another novelty at the time. According to Bosch, the production site had to operate continuously and smoothly, and any stoppage at any point led to a complete shut down and it would take several hours before it could restart, making production less profitable.

It was finally on May 7, 1911, in Oppau, Germany, that the construction of BASF's first industrial synthesis site officially began. Bosch supervised the project, ensuring its smooth running. On site, workers assembled compressors the size of locomotives, chemical reactors four times larger than those commonly used elsewhere in the chemical industry, a mini-factory to extract nitrogen from the air and purify it before injecting it into the reactors, kilometers of tubing, a complete electrical system including generators, a port shipping system attached to a marshalling yard, a laboratory operated by 180 researchers assisted by a thousand assistants, as well as housing for more than 10,000 workers.

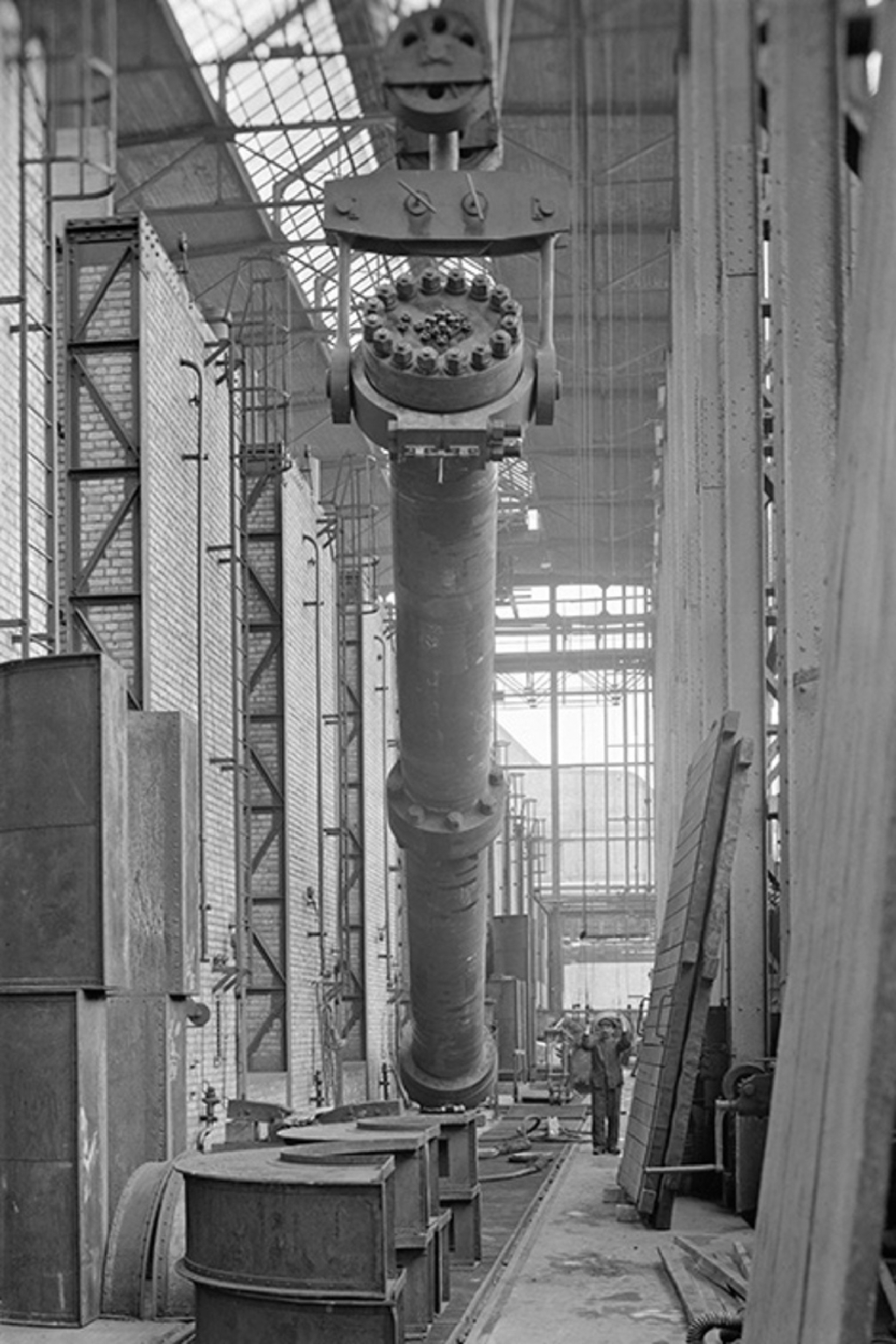
Inside the Oppau plant, a chemical reactor used for the synthesis of ammonia using the Haber-Bosch process. Photo taken in 1913.

The company was able to produce ammonia industrially from 1913. The Oppau site started production on September 9. In the same year, it was able to produce up to 30 tons of ammonia per day In 1914, the plant produced 8700 tons of ammonia, which was used to supply a neighboring unit, which produced 36000 tons of ammonium sulfate.

The Oppau site was not only an increasingly important source of revenue for BASF, as its steadily growing production was completely sold out, it also served as a laboratory. The site offered the opportunity to develop the emerging technology of high-pressure chemistry. Bosch and his colleagues encountered problems never seen before, but could explore different approaches without worrying about the costs associated with their development.

Carl Bosch's essential contribution
Carl Bosch's contribution to the early industrialization of the Haber process cannot be overestimated. It was his opinion that led BASF to embark on this path. From 1909 to 1913, he supervised several BASF research teams, including that of Alwin Mittasch who discovered a stable and inexpensive catalyst. It was Bosch that found a solution to a six-month-old problem that threatened the program. He also supervised the construction of the Oppau facility, a highly complex industrial site.

W. J. Landis, director of American Cyanamid, stated in 1915 that "« too much credit cannot be bestowed on the courageous chemists who succeeded in making the [Haber] process a commercial reality.[trad 4][112] }}. In addition to receiving various awards (including five honorary doctorates), Carl Bosch was jointly awarded the 1931 Nobel Prize in Chemistry "for [his] contributions to the invention and development of methods in high-pressure chemistry".

== Bibliography ==
- Auger, Pierre; Grmek, Mirko D. (1969). Encyclopédie internationale des sciences et des techniques. Verona, Italy: Presses de la Cité. p. 840.
- Bensaude-Vincent, Bernadette (2008). "Fritz Haber : un criminel de guerre récompensé". La Recherche (423): 66–70. ISSN 0029-5671.
- Bensaude-Vincent, Bernadette; Stengers, Isabelle (2001). Histoire de la chimie. Sciences humaines et sociales. Paris: La Découverte/Poche. p. 364. ISBN 2-7071-3541-0.
- Bosch, Carl (1931). The Development of the Chemical High Pressure Method During the Establishment of the New Ammonia Industry (PDF). Oslo, Sweden: Nobel Foundation. p. 45.
- Considine, Glenn D.; Kulik, Peter H. (2002). Ammonia. Vol. Van Nostrand's Scientific Encyclopedia, Ninth Edition. Canada: John Wiley & Sons, inc. pp. 140–143. ISBN 0-471-33230-5.
- Haber, Fritz (1920). The Synthesis of Ammonia From its Elements (PDF). Oslo, Sweden: Nobel Foundation. p. 15.
- Hager, Thomas (2008). The Alchemy of Air: A Jewish Genius, a Doomed Tycoon, and the Scientific Discovery That Fed the World but Fueled the Rise of Hitler. New York: Harmony Books. p. 336. ISBN 978-0-307-35178-4.
- Hayes, Peter (2001). Industry and Ideology : IG Farben in the nazi era. New York: Cambridge University Press (published 1971). ISBN 978-0-521-78638-6.
- Jeffreys, Diarmuid (2008). Hell's Cartel: IG Farben and the Making of Hitler's War Machine. Metropolitan Books. p. 496. ISBN 978-0805078138.
- Jones, K.; Bailar, J. C.; Emeléus, H. J.; Nyholm, Sir Ronald Sydney; Trotman-Dickenson, A. F. (1973). Nitrogen. Vol. Comprehensive Inorganic Chemistry. New York: Pergamon Press. p. 547. ISBN 0-08-017275-X.
- Lawrence, Stephen A. (2006). "An Introduction to the Amines". Amines. Synthesis, Properties and Applications. Cambridge University Press. p. 384. ISBN 978-0521029728.
- Maxwell, Gary R. (2004). Synthetic Nitrogen Products: A Practical Guide to the Products and Processes. Springer. p. 388. ISBN 978-0306482250.
- Smil, Vaclav (2001). Enriching the Earth: Fritz Haber, Carl Bosch, and the Transformation of World Food Production. MIT Press. p. 358. ISBN 978-0-262-69313-4.
- Travis, Tony (August 1993). "The Haber-Bosch process: exemplar of 20th century chemical industry". Entrepreneur (2). Society of Chemical Industry.
- Travis, Anthony S.; Schröter, Harm G.; Homburg, Ernst; Morris, Peter J. T. (1998). Determinants in the Evolution of the European Chemical Industry, 1900-1939: New Technologies, Political Frameworks, Markets and Companies (Chemists and Chemistry). Springer. p. 300. ISBN 978-0792348900.
- Wiley-VCH (2007). Ullmann's Agrochemicals. United States: Wiley-VCH. p. 932. ISBN 978-3527316045.
- Wisniak, Jaime (2002). "Fritz Haber - a Conflicting Chemist". Proceedings of the Indian National Science Academy. 37 (2): 153–173. ISSN 0019-5235.
