= Emma Wolffhardt =

German industrial chemist

Emma Maria Wolffhardt (born 27 July 1899; died 1997) was a German industrial chemist at BASF and she was the first women chemist at BASF who had her own research area. Furthermore, she was the first to use the calotte model for understanding and improving organic synthesis.

== Life ==
Wolffhardt studied at the University of Würzburg and the Karlsruhe Institute of Technology. She did her doctorate with Stefan Goldschmidt. Wolffhardt started her career at BASF in 1925. At first, she had to work in the literature office of the main laboratory. She was very unhappy in this job because she was not allowed to work in research. Months later, Alwin Mittasch, who was head of the laboratory at the time, searched for an assistant, and Wolffhardt applied and was appointed Mittasch assistant. Then, she supported Mittasch in his scientific work. In 1940, she received her own research area, where she researched the production of aviation fuel. She was the first to use the calotte model for understanding and improving organic synthesis. In this way, Wolffhardt was the first German researcher to archieve a yield of 8-10% for triptane. In 1950, Wolffhardt was the first women university graduate in the history of the company who celebrated her 25th anniversary. In 1960, she retired. She died in 1997 in Heidelberg. She had an adopted daughter.

== Selected publications ==
- Wolffhardt, Emma (1947). "Beiträge zur Verwendung der Atommodelle von H. A. Stuart in der organischen Chemie". Chemische Berichte (in German). 80 (1): 64–76. doi:10.1002/cber.19470800113.
- Wolffhardt, Emma (1964). Briefe Justus von Liebigs an König Max II. von Bayern 1853–1860 (in German). München: Verlag der Bayerischen Akademie der Wissenschaften. OCLC 439525317.
- Wolffhardt, Emma (1965). " ... Selbst der Luxus bedarf der Soda ...": von der Bedeutung einer Verordnung Maximilians II. für die Gründung der BASF Ludwigshafen (in German). Erscheinungsort nicht ermittelbar. OCLC 927478815.
- Goldschmidt, Stefan; Wolf, Anton; Wolffhardt, Emma; Drimmer, Israel; Nathan, Simon (1924). "Über Hydrazyle". Justus Liebigs Annalen der Chemie. 437 (1): 194–226. doi:10.1002/jlac.19244370113. ISSN 1099-0690.
- Wolffhardt, Emma (1924). Ueber Diphenyl-acyl-hydrazyle (Dissertation). Würzburg.
