= Luggin capillary =

A Luggin capillary (also Luggin probe, Luggin tip, or Luggin-Haber capillary) is a small tube that is used in electrochemistry. This tube is filled with electrolyte that allows the sensing point of a reference electrode to be positioned very close to the surface of a working electrode. By minimizing the distance between the reference sensing point and the working electrode, the device reduces the uncompensated solution resistance and the associated ohmic potential drop (iR drop), thereby improving the accuracy of electrode-potential measurements.

The device is named after the Austrian physicist and electrochemist Hans Luggin (1863–1899), who worked with Fritz Haber at the Technische Hochschule Karlsruhe during the late 1890s.

An apparatus employing a similar principle appears in a 1898 paper by Fritz Haber describing measurements of cathodic potentials during nitrobenzene reduction. In this apparatus, the cathode contained a small opening connected to a glass tube filled with electrolyte, which linked the immediate vicinity of the cathode to an external reference electrode.

According to the chemist Andrea Sella, the arrangement originated from discussions between Fritz Haber and Hans Luggin in Karlsruhe. While Fritz Haber sought a method for determining the local potential of a working electrode, Hans Luggin proposed placing the reference electrode in a separate compartment connected by a fine capillary extending close to the electrode surface. Andrea Sella further notes that Hans Luggin never published a dedicated description of the method and that the attribution of the device rests largely on Fritz Haber's subsequent references to his colleague's contribution.
