= Haber's rule =

Rule of thumb in toxicology

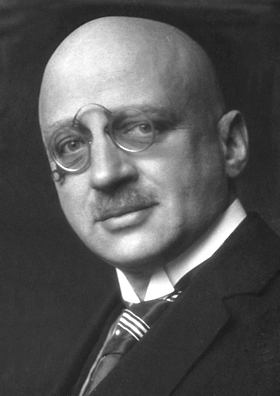
Chemist Fritz Haber, whom discovered Haber’s Rule

In toxicology, Haber's rule or Haber's law is a mathematical statement of the relationship between the concentration of a poisonous gas and how long the gas must be breathed to produce death, or other toxic effect. The rule was formulated by German chemist Fritz Haber in the early 1900s.

== Rule ==
Haber's rule states that, for a given poisonous gas, $tC = k$, where $C$ is the concentration of the gas (mass per unit volume), $t$ is the amount of time necessary to breathe the gas to produce a given toxic effect, and $k$ is a constant, depending on both the gas and the effect. Thus, the rule states that doubling the concentration will halve the time, for example.

It makes equivalent any two groupings of dose concentration and exposure time that have equivalent mathematical products. For instance, if we assign dose concentration the symbol C, and time the classic t, then for any two dose schema, if C_{1}t_{1}=C_{2}t_{2}, then under Haber's rule the two dose schema are equivalent.

Haber's rule is an approximation, useful with certain inhaled poisons under certain conditions, and Haber himself acknowledged that it was not always applicable. If a substance is efficiently eliminated in the host, for example, then Haber's Law breaks down in the limit of t approaching the order of the half-life of the drug, rewriting the equation as the integral ∫Cdt = constant for arbitrary varying C and elapsed time T. It is very convenient, however, because its relationship between $C$ and $t$ appears as a straight line in a log-log plot.

In 1940, statistician C. I. Bliss published a study of toxicity in insecticides in which he proposed more complex models, for example, expressing the relationship between $C$ and $t$ as two straight line segments in a log-log plot. However, because of its simplicity, Haber's rule continued to be widely used. Recently, some researchers have argued that it is time to move beyond the simple relationship expressed by Haber's rule and to make regular use of more sophisticated models.

== See also ==
- LD_{50}
- Toxicology
- Chemical warfare
- Area under the curve
