= The Demon Under the Microscope =

Book by Thomas Hager

- Cover
- Author: Thomas Hager
- Original title: The Demon Under the Microscope: From Battlefield Hospitals to Nazi Labs, One Doctor's Heroic Search for the World's First Miracle Drug
- Language: English
- Subject: History
- Genre: Non-fiction
- Publisher: Harmony
- Publication date: September 19, 2006
- Publication place: United States
- Pages: 352 pages
- ISBN: 978-1400082131

The Demon Under the Microscope: From Battlefield Hospitals to Nazi Labs, One Doctor's Heroic Search for the World's First Miracle Drug is a 2006 nonfiction book about the discovery of Prontosil, the first commercially available antibacterial antibiotic and sulfanilamide, the second commercial antibiotic. Prontosil was the first commercially available antibacterial antibiotic (with a relatively broad effect against Gram-positive cocci). It was developed in the 1930s by a research team at the Bayer Laboratories of the IG Farben conglomerate in Germany. The discovery and development of this first sulfonamide drug opened a new era in medicine.

== Overview ==
The book's form is narrative nonfiction, in which history is written with the color and drama of a novel. The major plot follows the life of German physician Gerhard Domagk, from his medical service in World War I through the discovery of Prontosil for the Bayer company in the 1920s, and his subsequent jailing by Nazi authorities for the crime of accepting a Nobel Prize in 1939.

In addition to Domagk's work, the book focuses on the competition between German and French researchers—notably those in the laboratory of Ernest Fourneau at the Pasteur Institute in Paris—both for income and credit for work with the groundbreaking family of new drugs. Finally, the book describes the dramatic impact of these first antibiotics on medicine and culture, through stories on their use (while still experimental) in saving the life of the son of President Franklin D. Roosevelt; their tie to a tragic mass poisoning in the 1930s; and the subsequent passage of legislation that set up the modern Food and Drug Administration (FDA), creating the blueprint for today's medicinal drug laws.

== Reception ==
Critical reception for the book was positive. In a starred review, Kirkus Reviews said Hager "does a remarkable job of transforming material fit for a biology graduate seminar into highly entertaining reading." The Wall Street Journal, in its review, noted "This is a grand story, and Mr. Hager tells it well, describing the birth of a new era in medicine -- soon to include penicillin and streptomycin -- and the difference it made to mankind. One can easily imagine The Demon Under the Microscope, like Microbe Hunters before it, inspiring in young, idealistic readers the enthusiasm for medical research and the zeal for healing that generates great physicians."
