= Robert Le Rossignol =

British chemist

Robert Le Rossignol (27 April 1884 – 26 June 1976) was a British chemist. He is most known for his work with Fritz Haber on the fixation of nitrogen from atmospheric air, the Haber process.

He was born in Saint Helier, Jersey, Channel Islands, and attended school there. He matriculated from the University of London in 1901 and graduated from University College London in 1905 where he remained, becoming a member of the Institute of Chemistry of Great Britain and a Fellow of the Chemical Society of London. In 1908–1909, he worked with Fritz Haber in Germany on the difficult problem of demonstrating ammonia synthesis from air, eventually producing a tabletop apparatus that worked at 200 atmospheres pressure. Haber was awarded the Nobel Prize for his discovery that virtually "made bread from the air" and recognized the assistance he'd received from Le Rossignol, whose name appears on Haber's patents for the process.

He was interned in Germany in 1914 at the outbreak of the first World War, but was released to work for the Auergesellschaft during the war. He returned to the UK after the war. He joined the General Electric Company (UK) research laboratory, where he remained for the rest of his career, working on thermionic valves.

He lived in Penn, Buckinghamshire and was a noted philanthropist using the royalty income he received from the Haber patent. One of his two sons committed suicide in 1934 due to believing that he was going to fail on his Chemistry exam for University. The other son died in World War II.
