= Thomas Hager =

American author of popular science

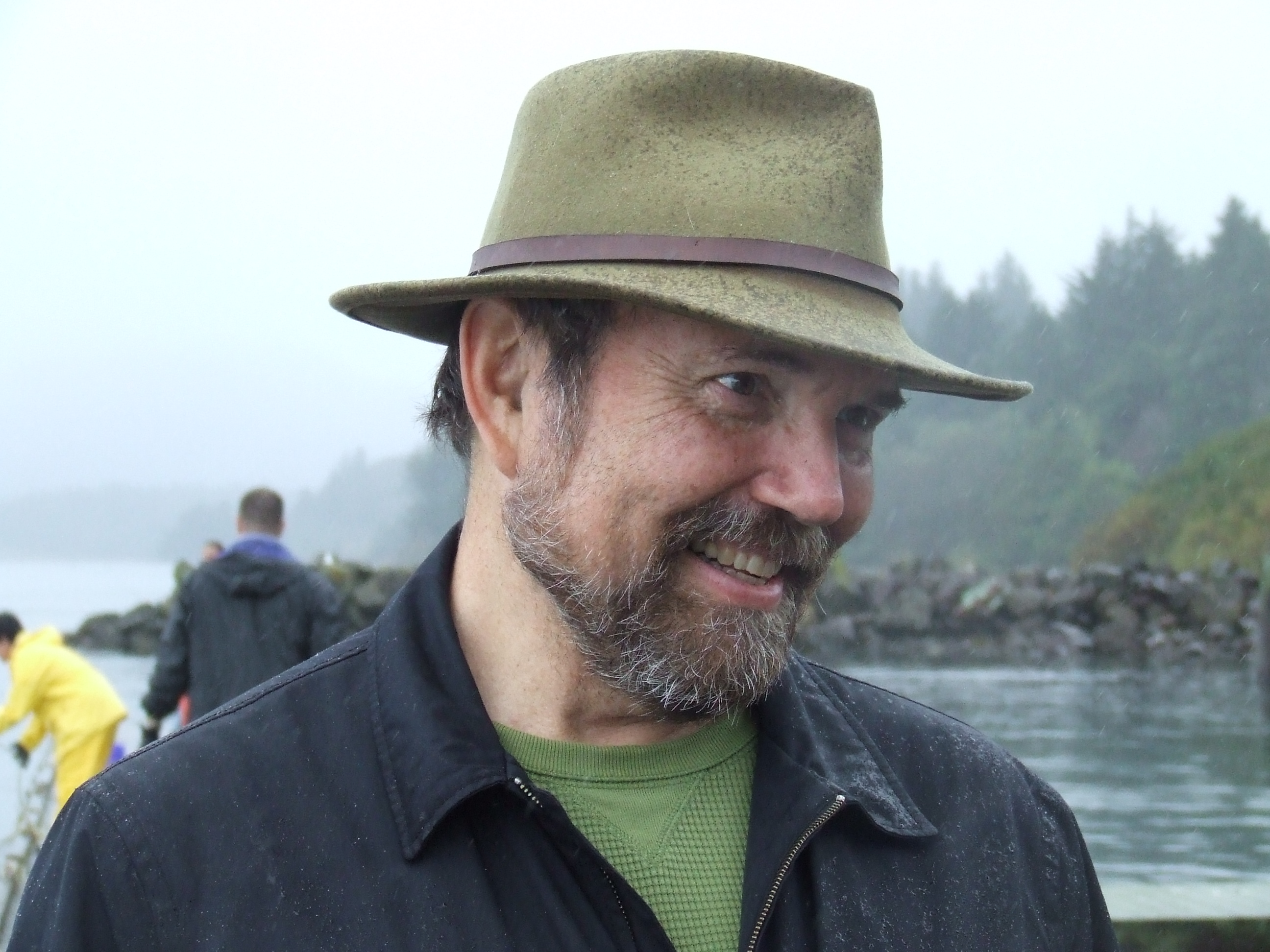
- Hager at the Oregon coast, 2010
- Born: April 18, 1953 (age 73); Portland, Oregon, United States
- Died: 2021
- Education: Oregon Health Sciences University (MS); University of Oregon (MA)
- Occupations: Writer, science historian, editor, publisher
- Spouse: Lauren Kessler
- Children: Jackson Hager, Zane Hager, Elizabeth Hager
- Writing career
- Genres: Science history, biography
- Website: www.thomashager.net

Thomas Hager is an American author of popular science and narrative nonfiction.

== Career ==
Thomas Hager is the author of twelve books on health and science, as well as more than 100 feature and news articles in a variety of popular and professional periodicals. His national awards include the American Chemical Society's 2017 James T. Grady–James H. Stack Award for Interpreting Chemistry for the Public.

Two of his books, Demon Under the Microscope and Ten Drugs, have been #1 bestsellers on Audible.com. Ten Drugs has been translated into fifteen foreign languages. The Alchemy of Air was a finalist for the National Academies Communication Award; listed among the "Best Books of The Year" by Kirkus Reviews; and named a Borders "Original Voices" Selection.

He has been a keynote speaker, invited lecturer and guest scholar at a number of universities, and has spoken widely to groups ranging from the American Association for the Advancement of Science and the Goddard Space Center to science pub nights and Rotary Clubs, industry conventions, agricultural meetings, medical gatherings, and all sorts of educational and professional organizations. His work has appeared in a wide range of periodicals, including the Wall St. Journal, Time, The Atlantic, and Reader's Digest. His media appearances include two talks on C-SPAN's Book TV; interviews on National Public Radio’s “Weekend Edition,” “Science Friday,” "Diane Rehm Show" and “Tech Nation;” and an expert role in the OPB documentary "Linus Pauling." His books have been translated into more than a dozen languages.

An Oregon native, Hager started his writing career after earning a master's degree in medical microbiology and immunology from the Oregon Health Sciences University and a second master's in journalism at the University of Oregon. He served as a communications intern at the National Cancer Institute, worked as a freelance medical writer, was a regular contributor to American Health, and was a West Coast news correspondent for the Journal of the American Medical Association. In 1983 he became founding editor of LC Magazine, a trade publication for scientists. At the University of Oregon he edited the award-winning Oregon Quarterly magazine for a decade, and then served a number of years as the UO's Director of Communications and Marketing, and director of the University of Oregon Press. He is currently a courtesy associate professor of journalism and communication at the UO.

He lives in Eugene, Oregon, with his wife, the writer Lauren Kessler. They have three children: Jackson, Zane, and Elizabeth.

== Bibliography ==
Books by Thomas Hager include:

- 2021, Electric City: The Lost History of Ford and Edison's American Utopia, Abrams Press. ISBN 978-1419747960
- 2019,Ten Drugs: How Plants, Powders, and Pills Have Shaped the History of Medicine, Abrams Press. ISBN 978-1419734403
- 2016, Understanding Statins: Everything You Need to Know About the World's Bestselling Drugs - And What to Ask Your Doctor Before Taking Them, Monroe Press. ISBN 978-1944533052
- 2016, Understanding Abilify: An Easy-to-Read Guide to Uses, Benefits, Side Effects, Withdrawal, and More, Monroe Press. ISBN 978-1944533014
- 2016, Understanding Zyprexa: An Easy-to-Read Guide to Uses, Side Effects, Withdrawal, and More, Monroe Press. ISBN 978-1944533045
- 2014, Feeding a Hungry World, International Fertilizer Development Center, Kindle/Amazon ASIN B00NLOLXE4
- 2008, The Alchemy of Air: A Jewish Genius, a Doomed Tycoon, and the Scientific Discovery that Fed the World but Fueled the Rise of Hitler, Harmony/Crown; paperback, audio, and digital editions. ISBN 978-0307351784
- 2006, The Demon under the Microscope: From Battlefield Hospitals to Nazi Labs, One Doctor’s Heroic Search for the World’s First Miracle Drug, Harmony/Crown; paperback, audio, and digital editions. ISBN 978-1400082131
- 2001, Linus Pauling: Scientist and Peacemaker, ed. with Clifford Mead, OSU Press. ISBN 978-0870714894
- 1998, Linus Pauling and the Chemistry of Life, Oxford University Press.
- 1995, Force of Nature: The Life of Linus Pauling, Simon & Schuster. ISBN 978-0684809090
- 1990, Aging Well, with Lauren Kessler, Fireside Press. ISBN 978-0671724764
