= August Bernthsen =

German chemist

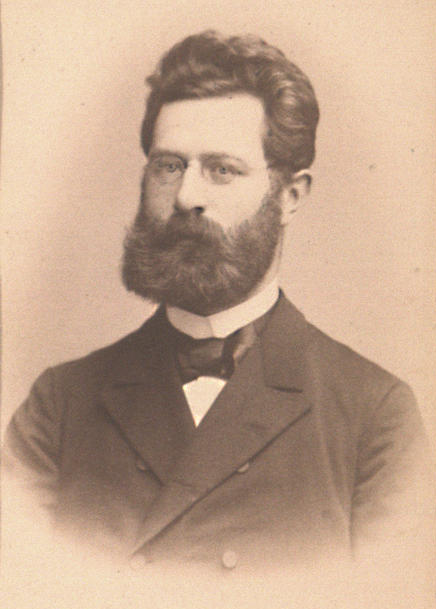

Heinrich August Bernthsen (29 August 1855 – 26 November 1931) was a German chemist who was among the first to synthesize and study the structures of methylene blue and phenothiazine.

Bernthsen was born to Heinrich Friedrich and Anna Sybilla Terheggen in Krefeld, Prussia. He studied the natural sciences before studying chemistry at Bonn and Heidelberg. After studying under Robert Bunsen he became an assistant to August Kekule. He worked from 1883 at the University of Heidelberg and from 1887 at the Badische Anilin- und Soda-Fabrik chemical company in Ludwigshafen am Rhein. He developed a number of dyes, many of which were patented. He also pioneered the synthesis of several chemicals including phenothiazine and methylene blue.
