= Fritz Haber =

German chemist (1868–1934)

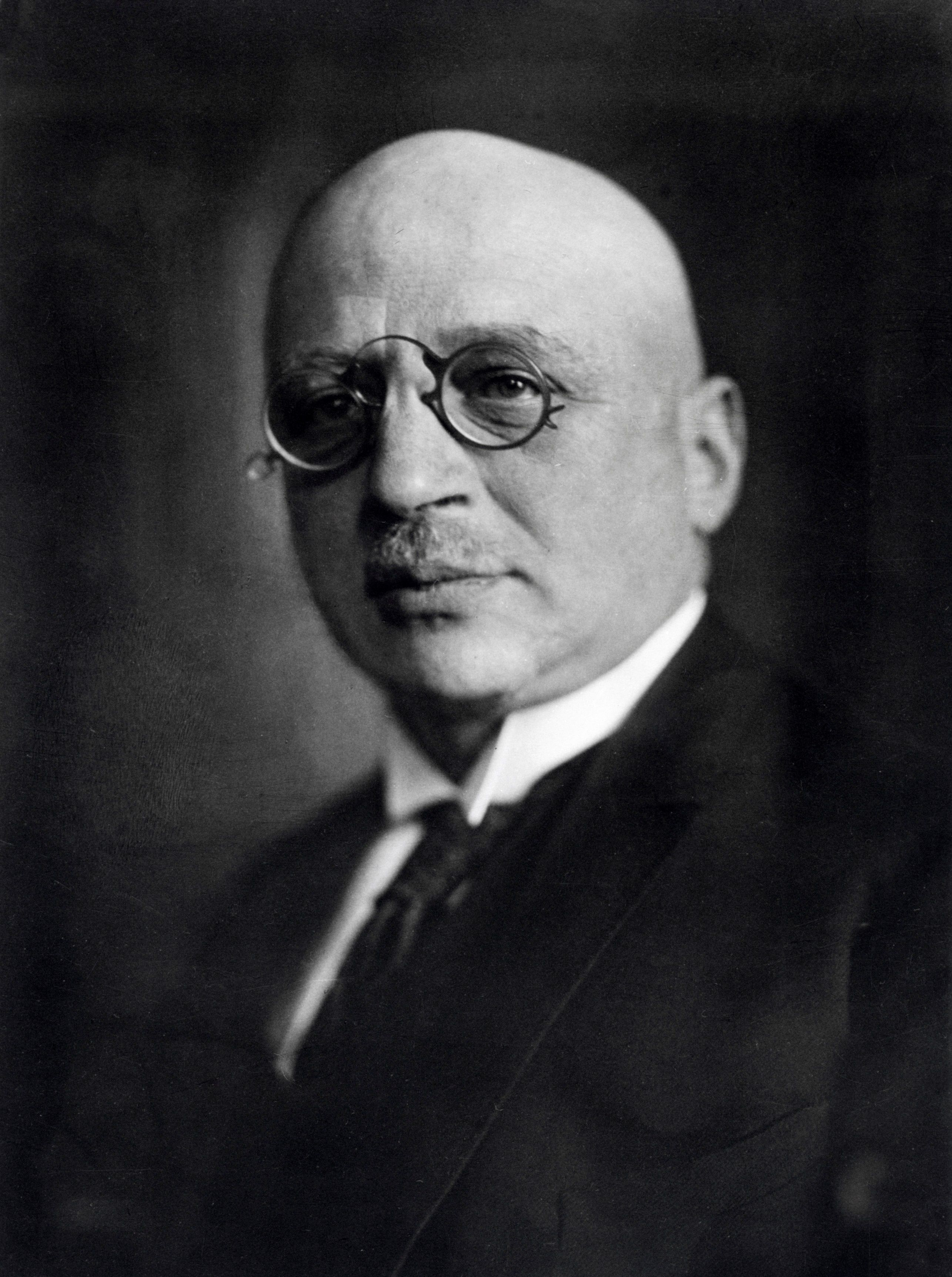
- Born: 9 December 1868; Breslau, Kingdom of Prussia, North German Confederation
- Died: 29 January 1934 (aged 65); Basel, Switzerland
- Education: University of Heidelberg; University of Berlin (PhD); Technische Universität Berlin; ETH Zürich
- Known for: Haber process; Haber's rule; Born–Haber cycle; Haber–Weiss reaction; Chemical warfare; Fertilizers; Surface science
- Spouses: Clara Immerwahr (m. 1901; d 1915) Charlotte Nathan (m. 1917; div. 1927)
- Children: 3
- Awards: Iron Cross (1915); Nobel Prize in Chemistry (1918); Rumford Medal (1932); International membership of NAS (1932)
- Scientific career
- Fields: Physical chemistry
- Workplaces: Swiss Federal Institute of Technology; University of Karlsruhe

Fritz Jakob Haber (German: [ˈfʁɪt͡s ˈhaːbɐ]; 9 December 1868 – 29 January 1934) was a German chemist who received the Nobel Prize in Chemistry in 1918 for his invention of the Haber process, a method used in industry to synthesize ammonia from nitrogen gas and hydrogen gas. This invention is important for the large-scale synthesis of fertilizers and explosives. It is estimated that a third of annual global food production uses ammonia from the Haber–Bosch process, and that this food supports nearly half the world's population. For this work, Haber has been called one of the most important scientists and industrial chemists in human history. Haber also, along with Max Born, proposed the Born–Haber cycle as a method for evaluating the lattice energy of an ionic solid.

Haber, a known German nationalist, is also considered the "father of chemical warfare" for his years of pioneering work developing and weaponizing chlorine and other poisonous gases during World War I. He first proposed the use of the heavier-than-air chlorine gas as a weapon to break the trench deadlock during the Second Battle of Ypres. His work was later used, without his direct involvement, to develop the Zyklon B pesticide used for the killing of more than 1 million Jews in gas chambers in the greater context of the Holocaust.

Following the Nazis' rise to power in 1933, Haber resigned from his position. Already in poor health, he spent time in various countries before Chaim Weizmann invited him to become the director of the Sieff Research Institute (now the Weizmann Institute) in Rehovot, Mandatory Palestine. He accepted the offer but died of heart failure mid-journey in a hotel in Basel, Switzerland on 29 January 1934, aged 65.

== Early life and education ==
Haber was born in Breslau, Kingdom of Prussia (now Wrocław, Poland), into a well-off Jewish family. Though Haber was a common family name in Breslau, the family has been traced back to a great-grandfather, Pinkus Selig Haber, who was a wool dealer from Kempen (now Kępno, Poland). An important Prussian edict of 13 March 1812 determined that Jews and their families, including Pinkus Haber, were "to be treated as local citizens and citizens of Prussia". Under such regulations, members of the Haber family were able to establish themselves in respected positions in business, politics, and law.

Haber was the son of Siegfried and Paula Haber, who were first cousins who married in spite of considerable opposition from their families. Haber's father Siegfried was a well-known merchant in the town, who had founded his own business in dye pigments, paints and pharmaceuticals. Paula experienced a difficult pregnancy and died three weeks after Fritz's birth, leaving Siegfried devastated and Fritz in the care of various aunts. When Haber was about six years old, Siegfried remarried to Hedwig Hamburger. Siegfried and his second wife had three daughters: Else, Helene, and Frieda. Although his relationship with his father was distant and often difficult owing to Fritz being associated with the death of his first wife, Haber developed close relationships with his stepmother and his half-sisters. Siegfried displayed love and care for his three daughters but never fully accepted Fritz as his son.

By the time Fritz was born, the Habers had to some extent become assimilated into German society. He attended primary school at the Johanneum School, a "simultaneous school" open equally to Catholic, Protestant, and Jewish students. At age 11, he went to school at the St Elizabeth classical school in Breslau, in a class evenly divided between Protestant and Jewish students. His family supported the Jewish community and continued to observe many Jewish traditions, but were not strongly associated with the synagogue. Haber identified strongly as German, less so as Jewish.

Haber successfully passed his examinations at the St Elizabeth gymnasium in September 1886. Although his father wished him to become an apprentice in the dye company, Haber obtained his father's permission to study chemistry at the Friedrich Wilhelm University in Berlin (today the Humboldt University of Berlin), with the director of the Institute for Chemistry A. W. Hofmann. Haber was disappointed by his initial winter semester (1886–87) in Berlin, and arranged to attend Heidelberg University for the summer semester of 1887, where he studied under Robert Bunsen. He then returned to Berlin, to the Technische Hochschule in Charlottenburg (today Technische Universität Berlin).

In the summer of 1889, Haber was conscripted and left university to perform his one-year volunteer service in the Sixth Field Artillery Regiment. Upon its completion, he returned to Charlottenburg where he became a student of Carl Liebermann. In addition to Liebermann's lectures on organic chemistry, Haber also attended lectures by Otto Witt on the chemical technology of dyes.

Liebermann assigned Haber to work on reactions with piperonal for his thesis topic, published as Ueber einige Derivate des Piperonals (About a Few piperonal Derivatives) in 1891. Haber received his doctorate cum laude from Friedrich Wilhelm University in May 1891, after presenting his work to a board of examiners from the University of Berlin, since Charlottenburg was not yet accredited to grant doctorates.

With his degree, Haber returned to Breslau to work at his father's chemical business, where their relationship continued to have difficulties. Through Siegfried's connections, Haber was assigned a series of practical apprenticeships in different chemical companies to gain experience. These included Grünwald and Company (a Budapest distillery), an Austrian ammonia-sodium factory, and the Feldmühle paper and cellulose works. These experiences drove Haber to learn more about technical processes, and persuaded his father to let him spend a semester at the Polytechnic College in Zürich (now the ETH Zürich), studying with Georg Lunge. In the Fall of 1892, Haber returned again to Breslau to work in his father's company, but the two men continued to clash and Siegfried finally accepted that they could not work well together.

Haber had received a PhD in chemistry by this time, but his father required him to take handwriting courses and become a salesman to learn more about the company. Haber urged his father to transfer from natural to synthetic dyes, but his father refused. Eventually, his father followed global business trends and switched to synthetic dyes. Haber's next suggestion, during a cholera epidemic, was for his father to purchase calcium hypochlorite, which at the time was the only known method for the prevention of cholera. That epidemic ended up being isolated and resulted in their possession of a sizeable amount of unused calcium hypochlorite, which is unstable. This caused a rift between Siegfried and Haber, with his father telling him to go back to his university studies as he did not belong in the business world.

== Early career ==
Haber then sought an academic appointment, first working as an independent assistant to Ludwig Knorr at the University of Jena between 1892 and 1894. During his time in Jena, Haber converted from Judaism to Lutheranism, possibly in an attempt to improve his chances of getting a better academic or military position. Knorr recommended Haber to Carl Engler, a chemistry professor at the University of Karlsruhe who was intensely interested in the chemical technology of dyes and the dye industry, and the study of synthetic materials for textiles. Engler referred Haber to a colleague in Karlsruhe, Hans Bunte, who made Haber an Assistent in 1894.

Bunte suggested that Haber examine the thermal decomposition of hydrocarbons. By making careful quantitative analyses, Haber was able to establish that "the thermal stability of the carbon-carbon bond is greater than that of the carbon-hydrogen bond in aromatic compounds and smaller in aliphatic compounds", a classic result in the study of pyrolysis of hydrocarbons. This work became Haber's habilitation thesis.

Haber was appointed a Privatdozent in Bunte's institute, taking on teaching duties related to the area of dye technology, and continuing to work on the combustion of gases. In 1896, the university supported him in travelling to Silesia, Saxony, and Austria to learn about advances in dye technology.

In 1897 Haber made a similar trip to learn about developments in electrochemistry. He had been interested in the area for some time, and had worked with another privatdozent, Hans Luggin, who gave theoretical lectures in electrochemistry and physical chemistry. Haber's 1898 book Grundriss der technischen Elektrochemie auf theoretischer Grundlage (Outline of technical electrochemistry based on theoretical foundations) attracted considerable attention, particularly his work on the reduction of nitrobenzene. In the book's foreword, Haber expresses his gratitude to Luggin, who died on 5 December 1899. Haber collaborated with others in the area as well, including Georg Bredig, a student and later an assistant of Wilhelm Ostwald in Leipzig.

Bunte and Engler supported an application for further authorization of Haber's teaching activities, and on 6 December 1898, Haber was invested with the title of Extraordinarius and an associate professorship, by order of the Grand Duke Friedrich von Baden.

Haber worked in a variety of areas while at Karlsruhe, making significant contributions in several areas. In the area of dye and textiles, he and Friedrich Bran were able to explain theoretically steps in textile printing processes developed by Adolf Holz. Discussions with Carl Engler prompted Haber to explain autoxidation in electrochemical terms, differentiating between dry and wet autoxidation. Haber's examinations of the thermodynamics of the reaction of solids confirmed that Faraday's laws hold for the electrolysis of crystalline salts. This work led to a theoretical basis for the glass electrode and the measurement of electrolytic potentials. Haber's work on irreversible and reversible forms of electrochemical reduction are considered classics in the field of electrochemistry. He also studied the passivity of non-rare metals and the effects of electric current on corrosion of metals. In addition, Haber published his second book, Thermodynamik technischer Gasreaktionen: sieben Vorlesungen (1905) trans. Thermodynamics of technical gas-reactions: seven lectures (1908), later regarded as "a model of accuracy and critical insight" in the field of chemical thermodynamics.

In 1906, Max Le Blanc, chair of the physical chemistry department at Karlsruhe, accepted a position at the University of Leipzig. After receiving recommendations from a search committee, the Ministry of Education in Baden offered the full professorship for physical chemistry at Karlsruhe to Haber, who accepted the offer.

== Haber Process ==
In 1909, Haber was the first chemist to successfully create ammonia through synthetic means. This had been a goal ardently pursued but never achieved due to the large energy costs that the process requires. Through subjecting nitrogen and hydrogen together at a temperature of 500 Celsius (about 932 degrees Fahrenheit) and a pressure of 2900 psi in the presence of a catalyst, ammonia is able to be formed. This initial process however, was at lab production quantity. This would change in 1913, when Carl Bosch, a German chemist with a focus in pressure chemistry, scaled the production to industrial levels. This new process, now named the Haber-Bosch process, was much more efficient as new methods were discovered. This new method made use of a more refined and cheaper iron catalyst, instead of the uranium or osmium catalyst that were used prior. By decreasing temperature, but increasing pressure, it was discovered that the rate at which ammonia was formed was increased. With an increase in production and cheaper materials being used during production, products that had a nitrogen base, such as fertilizer, became mass producible. Synthetic fertilizers allowed for the production of better, healthier crops at faster speeds. This increase in output allowed farmers to grow more food with the same amount of land in the same amount of time compared to before the use of fertilizers. By increasing output of food, it effectively allowed population rates to grow at speeds that weren’t possible or sustainable throughout history.

However, the use of synthetic fertilizers does have lasting impacts on the area around them. The use of synthetic fertilizers helps crops, but when exposed to bodies of water through runoff or other methods, it can have detrimental effects on local wildlife. The now nitrogen rich water creates an opportunity for algae blooms to form. This often harms the local fauna due to oxygen being removed from the water by the algae, causing areas of water that contain no oxygen.

== Nobel Prize ==
During his time at University of Karlsruhe from 1894 to 1911, Haber and his assistant Robert Le Rossignol invented what would become the Haber–Bosch process, which is the catalytic formation of ammonia from hydrogen and atmospheric nitrogen under conditions of high temperature and pressure. This discovery was a direct consequence of Le Châtelier's principle, announced in 1884, which states that when a system is in equilibrium and one of the factors affecting it is changed, the system will respond by minimizing the effect of the change. Since it was known how to decompose ammonia in the presence of a nickel-based catalyst, one could derive from Le Châtelier's principle that the reaction could be reversed to produce ammonia at high temperature and pressure. (Actually the reaction's equilibria is improved at low temperatures which resulted in the need for a catalyst. At high temperatures, ammonia decomposes to its elements.)

To further develop the process for large-scale ammonia production, Haber turned to industry. Partnering with Carl Bosch at BASF, the process was successfully scaled up to produce commercial quantities of ammonia. The Haber–Bosch process was a milestone in industrial chemistry. The production of nitrogen-based products such as fertilizer and chemical feedstocks, which was previously dependent on acquisition of ammonia from limited natural deposits, now became possible using an easily available and abundant base: atmospheric nitrogen. The ability to produce much larger quantities of nitrogen-based fertilizers in turn supported much greater agricultural yields, supporting half the world's population.

The discovery of a new way of producing ammonia had other significant economic impacts as well. Chile had been a major (and almost unique) exporter of natural deposits such as sodium nitrate (caliche). After the introduction of the Haber process, naturally extracted nitrate production in Chile fell from 2.5 million tons (employing 60,000 workers and selling at US$45/ton) in 1925 to just 800,000 tons, produced by 14,133 workers, and selling at $19/ton in 1934.

The annual world production of synthetic nitrogen fertilizer is currently more than 100 million tons. The food base of half the current world population is based on the Haber–Bosch process.

Haber was awarded the 1918 Nobel Prize in Chemistry for this work (he actually received the award in 1919). In his acceptance speech for that Nobel Prize Haber commented "It may be that this solution is not the final one. Nitrogen bacteria teach us that Nature, with her sophisticated forms of the chemistry of living matter, still understands and utilizes methods which we do not as yet know how to imitate."

Haber was also active in the research on combustion reactions, the separation of gold from sea water, adsorption effects, electrochemistry, and free radical research (see Fenton's reagent). A large part of his work from 1911 to 1933 was done at the Kaiser Wilhelm Institute for Physical Chemistry and Electrochemistry at Berlin-Dahlem. In 1953, this institute was renamed for him. He is sometimes credited, incorrectly, with first synthesizing MDMA (which was first synthesized by Merck KGaA chemist Anton Köllisch in 1912).

== World War I ==
Haber greeted World War I with enthusiasm, joining 92 other German intellectuals in signing the Manifesto of the Ninety-Three in October 1914, a proclamation that galvanized support for the war in German schools and universities. Haber played a major role in the development of the non-ballistic use of chemical warfare in World War I, in spite of the proscription of their use in shells by the Hague Convention of 1907 (to which Germany was a signatory). He was promoted to the rank of captain and made head of the Chemistry Section in the Ministry of War soon after the war began. In addition to leading the teams developing chlorine gas and other deadly gases for use in trench warfare, Haber was on hand personally when it was first released by the German military at the Second Battle of Ypres (22 April to 25 May 1915) in Belgium. The team Haber assembled consisted of more than 150 scientists and 1,300 technical personnel. Haber also helped to develop gas masks with adsorbent filters which could protect against such weapons.

A special troop was formed for gas warfare (Pioneer Regiments 35 and 36) under the command of Otto Peterson, with Haber and Friedrich Kerschbaum as advisors. Haber actively recruited physicists, chemists, and other scientists to be transferred to the unit. Future Nobel laureates James Franck, Gustav Hertz, and Otto Hahn served as gas troops in Haber's unit. In 1914 and 1915, before the Second Battle of Ypres, Haber's unit investigated reports that the French had deployed Turpinite, a supposed chemical weapon, against German soldiers.

Gas warfare in World War I was, in a sense, the war of the chemists, with Haber pitted against French Nobel laureate chemist Victor Grignard. Regarding war and peace, Haber once said "during peace time a scientist belongs to the world, but during war time he belongs to his country". This was an example of the ethical dilemmas facing chemists at that time.

Haber was a patriotic German who was proud of his service during World War I, for which he was decorated. He was even given the rank of captain by the Kaiser, which Haber had been denied 25 years earlier during his compulsory military service.

In his studies of the effects of poison gas, Haber noted that exposure to a low concentration of a poisonous gas for a long time often had the same effect (death) as exposure to a high concentration for a short time. He formulated a simple mathematical relationship between the gas concentration and the necessary exposure time. This relationship became known as Haber's rule.

Haber defended gas warfare against accusations that it was inhumane, saying that death was death, by whatever means it was inflicted and referred to history: "The disapproval that the knight had for the man with the firearm is repeated in the soldier who shoots with steel bullets towards the man who confronts him with chemical weapons. [...] The gas weapons are not at all more cruel than the flying iron pieces; on the contrary, the fraction of fatal gas diseases is comparatively smaller, the mutilations are missing".

Haber received much criticism for his involvement in the development of chemical weapons in pre-World War II Germany, both from contemporaries, especially Albert Einstein, and from modern-day scientists.

== Between World Wars ==
From 1919 to 1923 Haber continued to be involved in Germany's secret development of chemical weapons, working with Hugo Stoltzenberg, and helping both Spain and Russia in the development of chemical gases.

During the 1920s, scientists working at Haber's institute developed the cyanide gas formulation Zyklon A, which was used as an insecticide, especially as a fumigant in grain stores.

From 1919 to 1925, in response to a request made by German ambassador Wilhelm Solf to Japan for Japanese support for German scholars in times of financial hardship, a Japanese businessman named Hoshi Hajime, the president of Hoshi Pharmaceutical Company, donated two million Reichsmark to the Kaiser Wilhelm Society as the 'Japan Fund' (Hoshi-Ausschuss). Haber was asked to manage the fund, and was invited by Hoshi to Japan in 1924. Haber offered a number of chemical licences to Hoshi's company, but the offers were refused. The money from the Fund was used to support the work of Richard Willstätter, Max Planck, Otto Hahn, Leo Szilard, and others.

In the 1920s, Haber searched exhaustively for a method to extract gold from sea water, and published a number of scientific papers on the subject. After years of research, he concluded that the concentration of gold dissolved in sea water was much lower than that reported by earlier researchers, and that gold extraction from sea water was uneconomic.

By 1931, Haber was increasingly concerned about the rise of National Socialism in Germany, and the possible safety of his friends, associates, and family. Under the Law for the Restoration of the Professional Civil Service of 7 April 1933, Jewish scientists at the Kaiser Wilhelm Society were particularly targeted. The Zeitschrift für die gesamte Naturwissenschaft ("Journal for all natural sciences") charged that "The founding of the Kaiser Wilhelm Institutes in Dahlem was the prelude to an influx of Jews into the physical sciences. The directorship of the Kaiser Wilhelm Institute for Physical and Electrochemistry was given to the Jew, F. Haber, the nephew of the big-time Jewish profiteer Koppel". (Koppel was not actually related to Haber.) Haber was stunned by these developments, since he assumed that his conversion to Christianity and his services to the state during World War I should have made him a German patriot. Ordered to dismiss all Jewish personnel, Haber attempted to delay their departures long enough to find them somewhere to go. As of 30 April 1933, Haber wrote to Bernhard Rust, the national and Prussian minister of Education, and to Max Planck, president of the Kaiser Wilhelm Society, to tender his resignation as the director of the Kaiser Wilhelm Institute, and as a professor at the university, effective 1 October 1933. He said that although as a converted Jew he might be legally entitled to remain in his position, he no longer wished to do so.

Haber and his son Hermann also urged that Haber's children by Charlotte Nathan, at boarding school in Germany, should leave the country. Charlotte and the children moved to the United Kingdom around 1933 or 1934. After the war, Charlotte's children became British citizens.

== Personal life and family ==
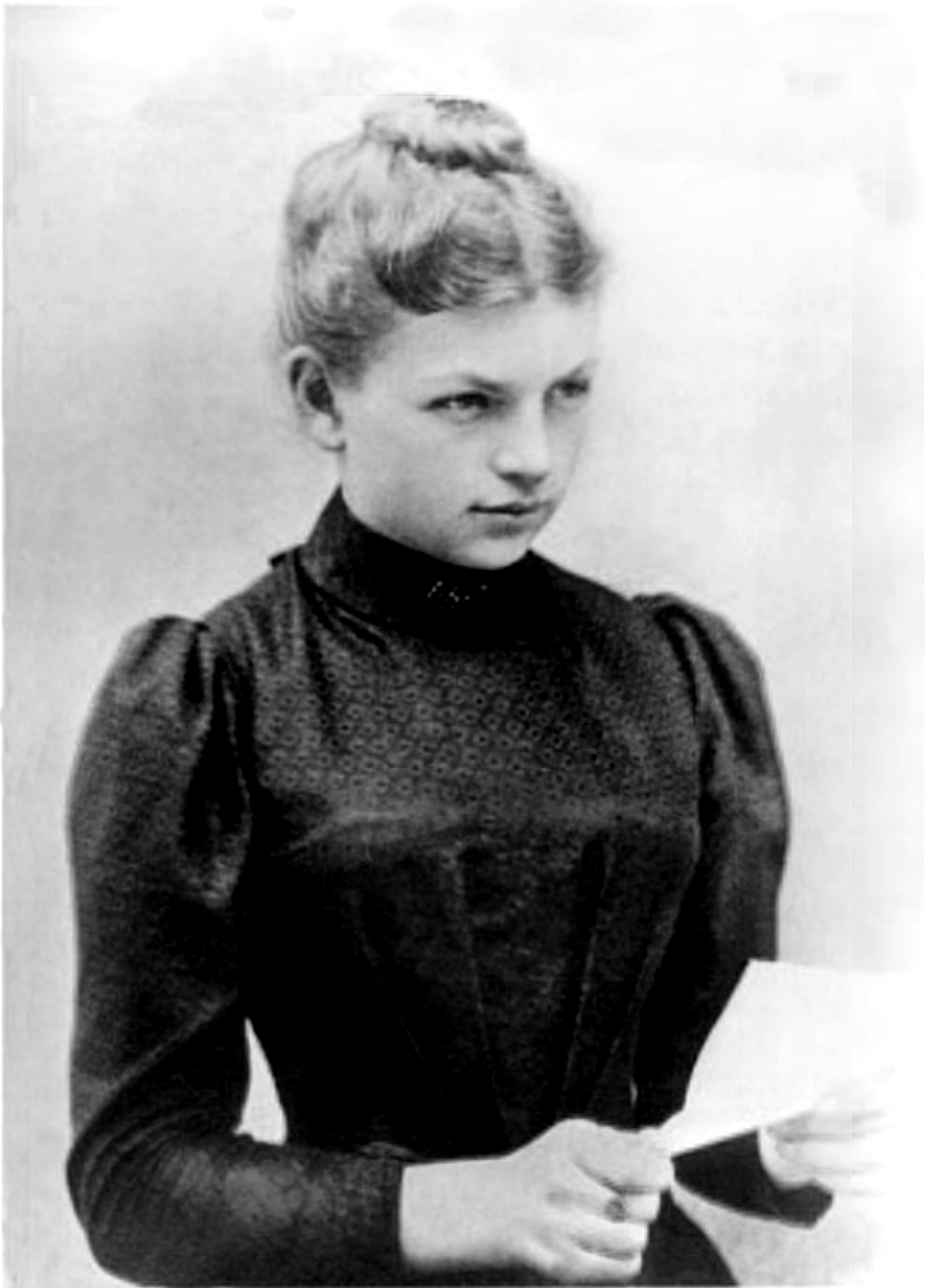
Haber's first wife, Clara Immerwahr

Haber met Clara Immerwahr in Breslau in 1889, while he was serving his required year in the military. Clara was the daughter of a chemist who owned a sugar factory, and was the first woman to earn a PhD (in chemistry) at the University of Breslau. She converted from Judaism to Christianity in 1897, several years before she and Haber became engaged. They were married on 3 August 1901; their son Hermann was born on 1 June 1902.

Clara was a women's rights activist and according to some accounts, a pacifist. Intelligent and a perfectionist, she became increasingly depressed after her marriage and the resulting loss of her career. On 2 May 1915, following an argument with Haber, Clara died of suicide in their garden by shooting herself in the heart with his service revolver. She did not die immediately, and was found by her 12-year-old son, Hermann, who had heard the shot.

The reasons for her suicide remain the subject of speculation. There were multiple stresses in the marriage, and it has been suggested that she opposed Haber's work in chemical warfare. According to this view, her suicide was in part a response to Haber's having personally overseen the first successful use of chlorine gas during the Second Battle of Ypres, resulting in over 67,000 casualties. Haber left within days for the Eastern Front to oversee gas release against the Russian Army. Originally buried in Dahlem, Clara's remains were later transferred at her husband's request to Basel, where she is buried next to him.

Haber married his second wife, Charlotte Nathan, on 25 October 1917 in Berlin. When out travelling, Fritz was staying at the Adlon Hotel which was near the Deutscher Klub. At this establishment, Fritz met Nathan, who was one of the secretaries and sparked his interest with her accomplishments despite not having extensive experience or education. On the day that he met her, it had been raining and she gave him an umbrella to use to which he replied "I lay the umbrella into your arms and myself and my thanks at your feet". She replied "I'd rather like the contrary". They began seeing each other and he would soon propose to her. Charlotte rejected the proposal at first due to their large age difference but she eventually agreed. Charlotte, like Clara, converted from Judaism to Christianity before marrying Haber. The couple had two children, Eva-Charlotte and Ludwig Fritz ("Lutz"). Again, however, there were conflicts, and the couple were divorced as of 6 December 1927.

Haber and Clara's son, Hermann Haber, lived in France until 1941, but was unable to obtain French citizenship. When Germany invaded France during World War II, Hermann and his wife and three daughters escaped internment on a French ship travelling from Marseilles to the Caribbean. From there, they obtained visas allowing them to immigrate to the United States. Hermann's wife Margarethe died after the end of the war, and Hermann committed suicide in 1946. His oldest daughter, Claire, committed suicide in 1949; also a chemist, she had been told her research into an antidote for the effects of chlorine gas was being set aside, as work on the atomic bomb was taking precedence.

Fritz Haber's other son, Ludwig Fritz Haber (1921–2004), became an eminent British economist and wrote a history of chemical warfare in World War I, The Poisonous Cloud (1986). Hermann's daughter Eva lived in Kenya for many years, returning to England in the 1950s. She died in 2015, leaving three children, five grandchildren, and eight great-grandchildren. Several members of Haber's extended family died in Nazi concentration camps, including his half-sister Frieda's daughter, Hilde Glücksmann, her husband, and their two children.

== Death ==
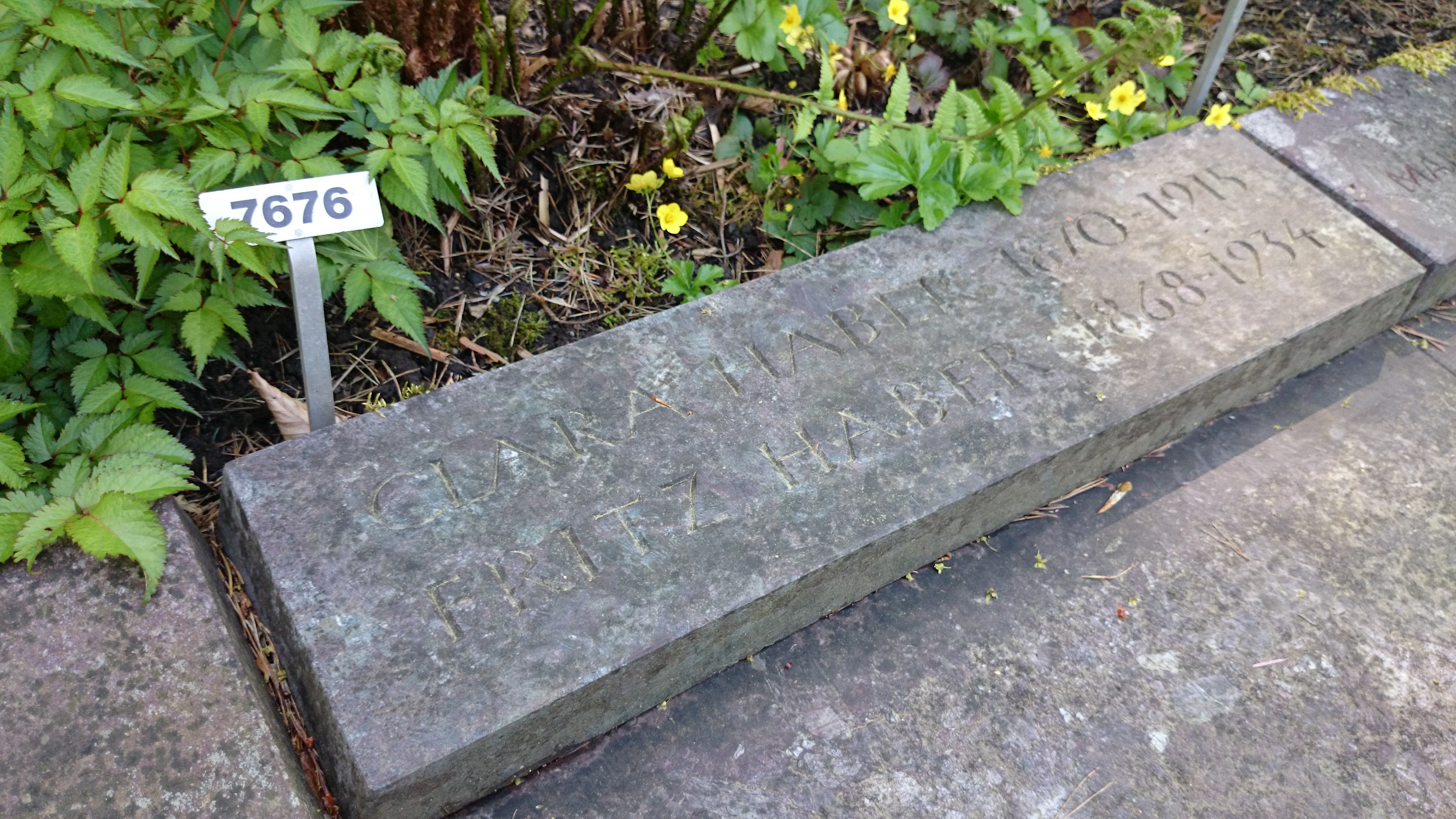
The grave of Fritz and Clara Haber (née Immerwahr) in the Hörnli graveyard of Basel, Switzerland

Haber left Dahlem in August 1933, staying briefly in Paris, Spain, and Switzerland. He was in extremely poor health during these travels. Haber specifically suffered attacks from angina. Repeated angina attacks can cause lasting damage which likely contributed to his death the next year.

In the meantime, some of the scientists who had been Haber's counterparts and competitors in England during World War I now helped him and others to leave Germany. Brigadier Harold Hartley, Sir William Jackson Pope and Frederick G. Donnan arranged for Haber to be officially invited to Cambridge, England. There, with his assistant Joseph Joshua Weiss, Haber lived and worked for a few months. Scientists such as Ernest Rutherford were less forgiving of Haber's involvement in poison gas warfare: Rutherford pointedly refused to shake hands with him.

In 1933, during Haber's brief sojourn in England, Chaim Weizmann offered him the directorship at the Sieff Research Institute (now the Weizmann Institute) in Rehovot, in Mandatory Palestine. He accepted, and left for the Middle East in January 1934, travelling with his half-sister, Else Haber Freyhahn. His ill health overpowered him and on 29 January 1934, at the age of 65, he died of heart failure, mid-journey, in a Basel hotel.

Following Haber's wishes, Haber and Clara's son Hermann arranged for Haber to be cremated and buried in Basel's Hörnli Cemetery on 29 September 1934, and for Clara's remains to be removed from Dahlem and re-interred with him on 27 January 1937 (see picture). Albert Einstein, his longtime friend, eulogized Haber with the following words: "Haber's life was the tragedy of the German Jew – the tragedy of unrequited love".

== Estate and legacy ==
Haber bequeathed his extensive private library to the Sieff Institute, where it was dedicated as the Fritz Haber Library on 29 January 1936. Hermann Haber helped to move the library and gave a speech at the dedication. It still exists as a private collection in the Weizmann Institute.

In 1981, the Minerva foundation of the Max Planck Society and the Hebrew University of Jerusalem (HUJI) established the Fritz Haber Research Center for Molecular Dynamics, based at the Institute of Chemistry of the Hebrew University. Its purpose is the promotion of Israeli-German scientific collaboration in the field of Molecular Dynamics. The Center's library is also called Fritz Haber Library, but it is not immediately clear whether there is any connection to the 1936 homonymous library of the Sieff (now Weizmann) Institute.

The institute most closely associated with his work, the former Kaiser Wilhelm Institute for Physical Chemistry and Electrochemistry at Dahlem (a suburb of Berlin), was renamed Fritz Haber Institute in 1953 and is part of the Max Planck Society.

== Awards and honours ==
- Foreign Honorary Member, American Academy of Arts and Sciences (1914)
- Nobel Prize in Chemistry (1918)
- Bunsen Medal of the Bunsen Society of Berlin, with Carl Bosch (1918)
- President of the German Chemical Society (1923)
- Wilhelm Exner Medal, 1929
- Honorary Member, Société Chimique de France (1931)
- Honorary Member, Chemical Society of England (1931)
- Honorary Member, Society of Chemical Industry, London, (1931)
- Rumford Medal, American Academy of Arts and Sciences (1932)
- Elected a Foreign Associate of the National Academy of Sciences, USA (1932)
- Honorary Member, USSR Academy of Sciences (1932)
- Board of Directors, International Union of Pure and Applied Chemistry, 1929–1933; Vice-President, 1931
- Goethe-Medaille für Kunst und Wissenschaft (Goethe Medal for Art and Science) from the President of Germany

== Dramatizations and fictionalizations ==
The Swedish power metal band Sabaton wrote the song "Father" about Haber.

A fictional description of Haber's life, and in particular his long-term relationship with Albert Einstein, appears in Vern Thiessen's 2003 play Einstein's Gift. Thiessen describes Haber as a tragic figure who strives unsuccessfully throughout his life to evade both his Jewish ancestry and the moral implications of his scientific contributions.

BBC Radio 4 Afternoon Play has broadcast two plays on the life of Fritz Haber. The description of the first reads: from the Diversity Website:

Bread from the Air, Gold from the Sea as another chemical story (R4, 1415, 16 Feb 01). Fritz Haber found a way of making nitrogen compounds from the air. They have two main uses: fertilizers and explosives. His process enabled Germany to produce vast quantities of armaments. (The second part of the title refers to a process for obtaining gold from sea water. It worked, but didn't pay.) There can be few figures with a more interesting life than Haber, from a biographer's point of view. He made German agriculture independent of Chilean saltpetre during the Great War. He received the Nobel Prize for Chemistry, yet there were moves to strip him of the award because of his work on gas warfare. He pointed out, rightly, that most of Nobel's money had come from armaments and the pursuit of war. After Hitler's rise to power, the government forced Haber to resign from his professorship and research jobs because he was Jewish.

The second play was titled The Greater Good and was first broadcast on 23 October 2008. It was directed by Celia de Wolff and written by Justin Hopper, and starred Anton Lesser as Haber. It explored his work on chemical warfare during World War I and the strain it put on his wife Clara (Lesley Sharp), concluding with her suicide and its cover-up by the authorities. Other cast included Dan Starkey as Haber's research associate Otto Sackur, Stephen Critchlow as Colonel Peterson, Conor Tottenham as Haber's son Hermann, Malcolm Tierney as General Falkenhayn and Janice Acquah as Zinaide.

In 2008, a short film titled Haber depicted Fritz Haber's decision to embark on the gas warfare program and his relationship with his wife. The film was written and directed by Daniel Ragussis.

In November 2008, Haber was again played by Anton Lesser in Einstein and Eddington.

In January 2012, Radiolab aired a segment on Haber, including the invention of the Haber Process, the Second Battle of Ypres, his involvement with Zyklon A, and the death of his wife, Clara.

In December 2013, Haber was the subject of a BBC World Service radio programme: "Why has one of the world's most important scientists been forgotten?".

His and his wife's life, including their relationship with the Einsteins, and Haber's wife's suicide, are featured prominently in the novel A Reunion of Ghosts by Judith Claire Mitchell. The characters are named Lenz and Iris Alter.

Haber's life and relationship to Albert Einstein was portrayed in the first season of Genius which aired on National Geographic Channel from 25 April to 27 June 2017.

== See also ==
- Nobel laureates in Chemistry
- List of Jewish Nobel laureates
- Luggin–Haber capillary

== Sources ==
- Hager, Thomas (9 September 2008). The Alchemy of Air: A Jewish Genius, a Doomed Tycoon, and the Scientific Discovery That Fed the World but Fueled the Rise of Hitler. Crown. ISBN 978-0-307-44999-3.
