= Alwin Mittasch =

German chemist (1869–1953)

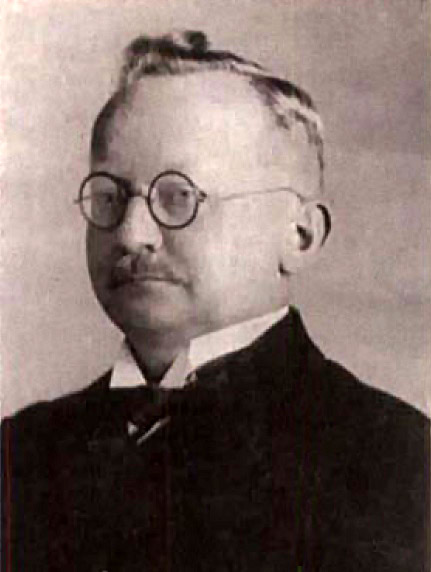
- 1928 at Munich
- Born: 27 December 1869; Großdehsa, Kingdom of Saxony
- Died: 4 June 1953 (aged 83); Heidelberg, West Germany
- Education: University of Leipzig 1901
- Scientific career
- Fields: Catalysis
- Workplaces: BASF
- Doctoral advisor: Wilhelm Ostwald

Paul Alwin Mittasch (Sorbian: Pawoł Alwin Mitaš; 27 December 1869 – 4 June 1953) was a German chemist and scientific historian of Sorbian descent. He is well known by his pioneering and systematic research in the development of catalysts for the industrial ammonia synthesis using the Haber–Bosch process.

== Life ==
Alwin Mittasch was born in 1869 as a son of a teacher in the Sorbian village of Großdehsa (Sorbian: Dažin) which is today part of Löbau in Germany. He had a brother and three sisters. He attended elementary school in his home village of Großdehsa. Then he changed to a boarding school in Bautzen, where in 1889 the teacher seminar finished. Then he began, like his father, a career as a teacher. He began as an assistant teacher at an elementary school. In 1892 he moved to Leipzig and began there as a sideline in University of Leipzig with the study of numerous fields to which history, philosophy, psychology counted, however, also the natural sciences. He concentrated on chemistry and in 1901 he received a doctorate in the department of the physical chemistry under Max Bodenstein. Wilhelm Ostwald was then in the department. His thesis dealt with nickel carbonyl complexes. In spite of full time employment as a teacher he finished this after one and a half years with summa cum laude. Mittasch could not pursue a habilitation because he had never achieved an Abitur. Therefore, he pivoted to industry. First it nailed up him after Stolberg near Aachen as an analytic chemist in AG for mining, manufacture of lead and zinc manufacture. A place followed as an assistant of Carl Bosch as well as the management of a research lab of BASF. After he entered by the untimely death of his oldest son Heinz Mittasch in 1932 early into the retirement, he resettled to Heidelberg and devoted himself to writing, music, and gardening. Mittasch was not a political person. Though in 1933 he probably gave his vote for the national socialist party, however, never was an ideological follower. In 1953 Alwin Mittasch died in Heidelberg. He was survived by his wife Dora Martha Mittasch (née Jäger) and his younger son Helmut Mittasch.

== Work ==
Mittasch's career began first in 1903 in Stolberg as a manufacturer of lead and zinc. After a short time he was promoted to a leading position in metallurgical engineering. However, after only one year he changed on recommendation of his university supervisor to the BASF where he took up his activity as an assistant to Carl Bosch. Besides that work, he also took part in the attempts with which nitrogen about Metallnitride as well as Metallcyanide should be fixed. In 1909 Mittasch began production on the base from Eisenoxid in whose result approx. 10,000 attempts were carried out for the optimization with the systematic search for a catalyst to generate ammonia. The found catalyst (iron (II/III) oxide Fe_{3}O_{4}, K_{2}O, CaO, Al_{2}O_{3} and SiO_{2}) allowed the large-scale technical ammoniated synthesis and is still in use, nearly unchanged, to this day. By his great success Mittasch became 1918 research leaders of the then newly-founded ammoniated laboratory of the BASF. Not only this start of the efficient catalyst to ammoniated production decreases to Mittasch but also the catalytic ammoniated oxidation to the nitric acid production, the high-pressure methanol synthesis (together with Matthias Pier in 1923) with mixing oxide catalysts (Zn(II) oxide and Chromium(III) oxide), as well as the Hochdruckcarbonylprozesse to the production of the purest metals such as nickel. The results of his works are held on in 85 patents which he announced mostly with his employees. For his knowledge and his engagement he received numerous honours for his works, including the honorary doctorate from the universities TH Munich and LwH Berlin, as well as an appointment as professor by the government of Baden-Wurttemberg. Alwin Mittasch awards to honour the DECHEMA regularly the Alwin Mittasch price (early Alwin Mittasch medallion) for prominent achievements in the area of the catalysis research.

After retiring from his career as a chemist, he wrote a lot about the history of chemistry as well as about the philosophy of the natural sciences, for which he received recognition from high-ranking people such as Theodor Heuss. In 1944 he started to write the Chronicle of my life.

== Works ==
- Chemische Dynamik des Nickelkohlenoxyds (Dissertation), Zeitschrift für physikalische Chemie, 1902, 40, 1–88
- Von Davy und Döbereiner bis Deacon. Ein halbes Jahrhundert Grenzflächenkatalyse, 1932 (mit E. Theis)
- Kurze Geschichte der Katalyse in Praxis und Theorie, 1939
- Lebensprobleme und Katalyse (1947)
- Von der Chemie zur Philosophie. Ausgewählte Schriften und Vorträge, 1948 (mit Autobibliographie)
- Geschichte der Ammoniaksynthese, Verlag Chemie, Weinheim, 1951, 196 Seiten
- Salpetersäure aus Ammoniak, 1953
- Erlösung und Vollendung. Gedanken über die letzten Fragen, 1953

== Honour ==
- Alwin Mittasch street (Germany, BASF)
- Alwin Mittasch place in Ludwigshafen (Germany)
- Lending of the honorary doctorate of the universities TH Munich and LwH Berlin
- Appointment the professor by Baden-Württembergsche government in 1949
