= List of nominees for the Nobel Prize in Chemistry =

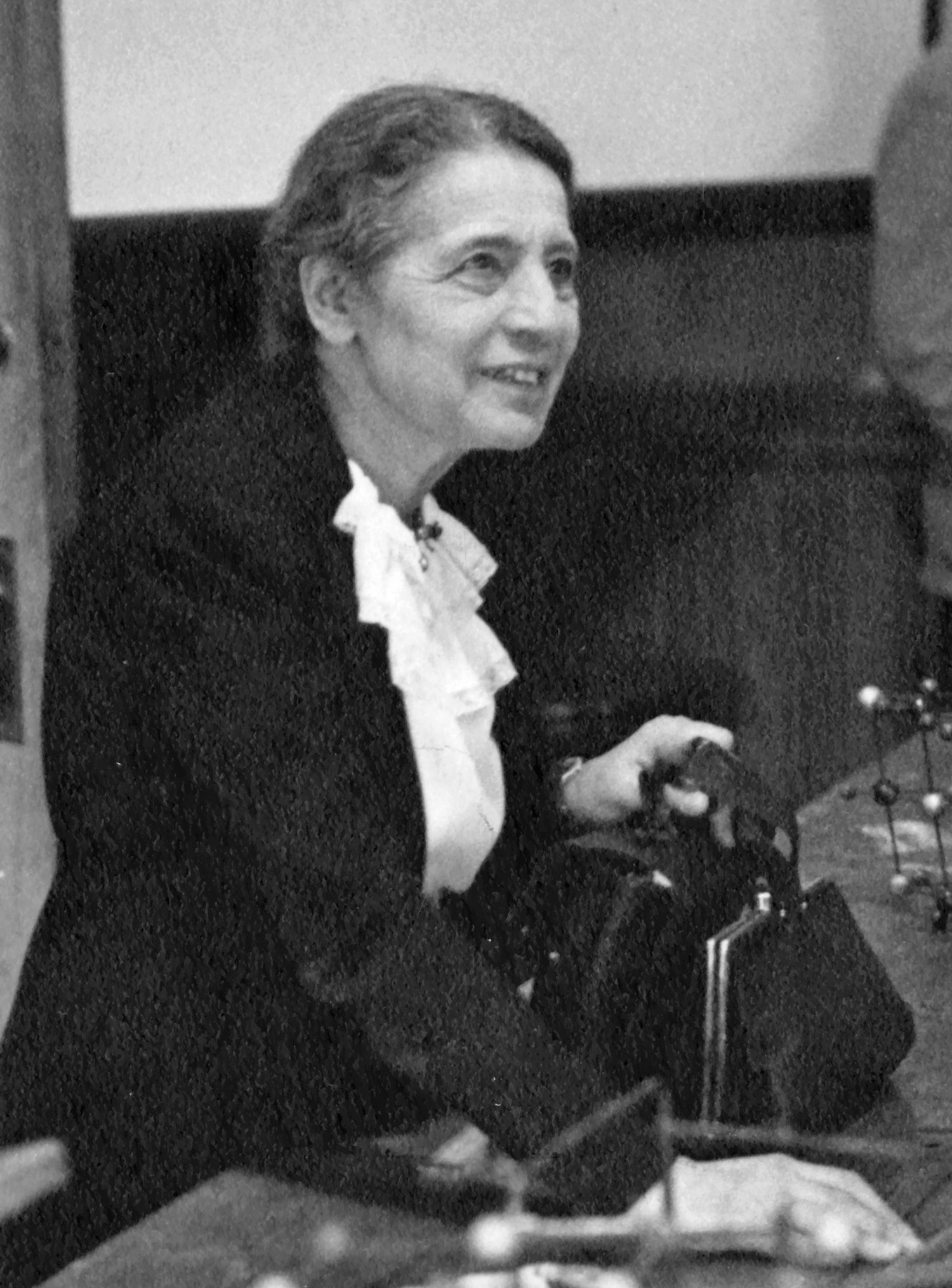
Lise Meitner, the second woman to be nominated for the Nobel Prize in Chemistry

The Nobel Prize in Chemistry (Swedish: Nobelpriset i kemi) is awarded annually by the Royal Swedish Academy of Sciences to scientists who have made outstanding contributions in chemistry. It is one of the five Nobel Prizes which were established by the will of Alfred Nobel in 1895.

Every year, the Royal Swedish Academy of Sciences sends out forms, which amount to a personal and exclusive invitation, to about three thousand selected individuals to invite them to submit nominations. The names of the nominees are never publicly announced, and neither are they told that they have been considered for the Prize. Nomination records are strictly sealed for fifty years. Currently, the nominations for the years 1901 to 1974 are publicly available. Despite the annual sending of invitations, the prize was not awarded in eight years (1916, 1917, 1919, 1924, 1933, 1940–42) and was delayed for a year nine times (1914, 1918, 1920, 1921, 1925, 1927, 1938, 1943, 1944).

From 1901 to 1974, there were 760 scientists nominated for the prize, 87 of whom were awarded the prize either jointly or individually. 14 more scientists from these nominees were awarded the prize after 1974, and Frederick Sanger received a second award in 1980. Of only 15 women nominees, three were awarded a prize. The first woman to be nominated was Marie Skłodowska Curie. She was nominated in 1911 by Swedish scientist Svante Arrhenius and French mathematician Gaston Darboux, and won the prize on the same year. She is the only woman to win the Nobel Prize twice: Physics (1903) and Chemistry (1911). Also, 32 and 15 scientists out of these nominees won the prizes in Physiology or Medicine and in Physics (including one woman more) respectively (including years after 1974). Only one company has been nominated: Geigy SA, for the year 1947.

Despite the long list of nominated noteworthy chemists, physicists and engineers, there have also been other scientists who were overlooked for the prize in chemistry, such as Per Teodor Cleve, Jannik Petersen Bjerrum, Ellen Swallow Richards, Alice Ball, Vladimir Palladin, Sergey Reformatsky, Prafulla Chandra Ray, Alexey Favorsky, Rosalind Franklin and Joseph Edward Mayer.

In addition, nominations of 21 scientists and four corporations more were declared invalid by the Nobel Committee.

== Nominees by their first nomination ==
=== 1901–1909 ===
Picture	Name	Born	Died	Years nominated	Notes
1901
	Jacobus Henricus van 't Hoff	30 August 1852; Rotterdam, South Holland, Netherlands	1 March 1911; Berlin, Germany	1901	Awarded the 1901 Nobel Prize in Chemistry (Note: "in recognition of the extraordinary services he has rendered by the discovery of the laws of chemical dynamics and osmotic pressure in solutions")
	Emil Fischer	9 October 1852; Euskirchen, North Rhine-Westphalia, Germany	15 July 1919; Berlin, Germany	1901, 1902, 1903, (Note: Nominations were declared invalid by the Nobel Committee - The Nobel Population 1901-1937: A Census of the Nominators and Nominees for the Prizes in Physics and Chemistry Elisabeth T. Crawford, J. L. Heilbron, Rebecca Ullrich (Office for History of Science and Technology, University of California, 1987)) 1905, 1916, 1919	Awarded the 1902 Nobel Prize in Chemistry, (Note: "in recognition of the extraordinary services he has rendered by his work on sugar and purine syntheses") later nominated for Nobel Prize in Physiology or Medicine too
	Svante Arrhenius	19 February 1859; Uppsala, Sweden	2 October 1927; Stockholm, Sweden	1901, 1902, 1903	Awarded the 1903 Nobel Prize in Chemistry (Note: "in recognition of the extraordinary services he has rendered to the advancement of chemistry by his electrolytic theory of dissociation") and nominated for Nobel Prize in Physics and in Physiology or Medicine too
	Henri Moissan	28 September 1852; Paris, France	20 February 1907; Paris, France	1901, 1902, 1903, 1904, 1905, 1906, 1907	Awarded the 1906 Nobel Prize in Chemistry (Note: "in recognition of the great services rendered by him in his investigation and isolation of the element fluorine, and for the adoption in the service of science of the electric furnace called after him")
	Zdenko Hans Skraup	3 March 1850; Prague, Czech Republic	10 September 1910; Vienna, Austria	1901	Nominated by Eduard Lippmann (1838–1919) the only time.
	Marcellin Berthelot	25 October 1827; Paris, France	18 March 1907; Paris, France	1901, 1902, 1903, 1904, 1906, 1907	
	William Jackson Pope	31 March 1870; London, England	17 October 1939; Cambridge, England	1901, 1907, 1915, 1916, 1927, 1932	
1902
	William Ramsay	2 October 1852; Glasgow, Scotland	23 July 1916; High Wycombe, Buckinghamshire, England	1902, 1903, 1904	Awarded the 1904 Nobel Prize in Chemistry (Note: "in recognition of his services in the discovery of the inert gaseous elements in air, and his determination of their place in the periodic system") and nominated for Nobel Prize in Physics too.
	Adolf von Baeyer	31 October 1835; Berlin, Germany	20 August 1917; Starnberg, Bavaria, Germany	1902, 1903, 1904, 1905	Awarded the 1905 Nobel Prize in Chemistry (Note: "in recognition of his services in the advancement of organic chemistry and the chemical industry, through his work on organic dyes and hydroaromatic compounds")
	Theodore William Richards	31 January 1868; Germantown, Philadelphia, United States	2 April 1928; Cambridge, Massachusetts, United States	1902, 1905, 1908, 1909, 1910, 1911, 1912, 1913, 1914, 1915, 1916	Awarded the 1914 Nobel Prize in Chemistry in 1915 (Note: "in recognition of his accurate determinations of the atomic weight of a large number of chemical elements")
	Oliver Wolcott Gibbs	21 February 1822; New York City, New York, United States	9 December 1908; Portsmouth, Rhode Island, United States	1902	Nominated by Charles Edward Munroe (1849–1938) the only time?
	Rudolf Knietsch	13 December 1854; Opole, Poland	28 May 1906; Ludwigshafen, Rhineland-Palatinate, Germany	1902	Nominated by Peter Klason (1848–1937) the only time.
	Johannes Wislicenus	24 June 1835; Querfurt, Saxony-Anhalt, Germany	5 December 1902; Leipzig, Saxony, Germany	1902	Nominated by Zdenko Hans Skraup (1850–1910) the only time but died before the only chance to be awarded.
	Edward Williams Morley	29 January 1838; Newark, New Jersey, United States	24 February 1923; West Hartford, Connecticut, United States	1902, 1908, 1909, 1910	
	Armand Gautier	23 September 1837; Narbonne, Aude France	27 July 1920; Cannes, Alpes-Maritimes, France	1902, 1914, 1915, 1916	Nominated for Nobel Prize in Physiology or Medicine too
1903
	Harmon Northrop Morse	15 October 1848; Cambridge, Vermont, United States	8 September 1920; Chebeague Island, Maine, United States	1903, 1910	Nominated by Harry Clary Jones (1865–1916) the only time.
1904
	Wilhelm Ostwald	2 September 1853; Riga, Latvia	4 April 1932; Grimma, Saxony, Germany	1904, 1905, 1906, 1907, 1908, 1909, 1910	Awarded the 1909 Nobel Prize in Chemistry. (Note: "in recognition of his work on catalysis and for his investigations into the fundamental principles governing chemical equilibria and rates of reaction")
1905
	Eduard Buchner	20 May 1860; Munich, Germany	13 August 1917; Focșani, Vrancea, Romania	1905, 1907	Awarded the 1907 Nobel Prize in Chemistry (Note: "for his biochemical researches and his discovery of cell-free fermentation") and nominated for Nobel Prize in Physiology or Medicine too
	Dmitri Mendeleev	8 February 1834; Tobolsk, Tyumen Oblast, Russia	2 February 1907; Saint Petersburg, Russia	1905, 1906, 1907	
	Giacomo Ciamician	27 August 1857; Trieste, Italy	2 January 1922; Bologna, Italy	1905, 1907, 1908, 1911, 1912, 1914, 1916, 1919, 1921	
	Henry Louis Le Chatelier	8 October 1850; Paris, France	17 September 1936; Miribel-les-Échelles, Isère, France	1905, 1907, 1908, 1909, 1914, 1915, 1916, 1918, 1919, 1920, 1921, 1922, 1926, 1927, 1928, 1929, 1930, 1931, 1934, 1935	Nominated for the Nobel Prize in Physics too.
1906
	Walther Nernst	25 June 1864; Wąbrzeźno, Kuyavian-Pomeranian, Poland	18 November 1941; Niwica,Lubusz, Poland	1906, 1907, 1908, 1909, 1910, 1911, 1912, 1913, 1914, 1915, 1916, 1917, 1918, 1919,1920, 1921, 1922	Awarded the 1920 Nobel Prize in Chemistry in 1921 (Note: "inn recognition of his work in thermochemistry") and nominated for Nobel Prize in Physics too.
	Victor Grignard	6 May 1871; Cherbourg-en-Cotentin, France	13 December 1935; Lyon, France	1906, 1909, 1910, 1912, 1928	Shared the 1912 Nobel Prize in Chemistry with Paul Sabatier (Note: "for the discovery of the so-called Grignard reagent, which in recent years has greatly advanced the progress of organic chemistry")
1907
	Ernest Rutherford	30 August 1871; Brightwater, Tasman, New Zealand	19 October 1937; Cambridge, England	1907, 1908, 1923	Awarded the 1908 Nobel Prize in Chemistry (Note: "for his investigations into the disintegration of the elements, and the chemistry of radioactive substances") and nominated for Nobel Prize in Physics too.
	Otto Wallach	27 March 1847; Königsberg, Germany	26 February 1931; Göttingen, Lower Saxony, Germany	1907, 1908, 1910	Awarded the 1910 Nobel Prize in Chemistry. (Note: "in recognition of his services to organic chemistry and the chemical industry by his pioneer work in the field of alicyclic compounds")
	Paul Sabatier	5 November 1854; Carcassonne, Aude, France	14 August 1914; Toulouse, Haute-Garonne, France	1907, 1909, 1911, 1912, 1928, 1929	Shared the 1912 Nobel Prize in Chemistry with Victor Grignard (Note: "for his method of hydrogenating organic compounds in the presence of finely disintegrated metals whereby the progress of organic chemistry has been greatly advanced in recent years")
	Alfred Werner	12 December 1866; Mulhouse, Haut-Rhin, France	15 November 1919; Zürich, Switzerland	1907, 1908, 1911, 1912, 1913	Awarded the 1913 Nobel Prize in Chemistry. (Note: "in recognition of his work on the linkage of atoms in molecules by which he has thrown new light on earlier investigations and opened up new fields of research especially in inorganic chemistry")
	Stanislao Cannizzaro	13 July 1826; Palermo, Italy	10 May 1910; Rome, Italy	1907	
	Sophus Mads Jørgensen	4 July 1837; Slagelse, Denmark	1 April 1914; Copenhagen, Denmark	1907	
	Fredrik Adolf Kjellin	24 April 1872; Södertälje, Sweden	30 December 1910; Stockholm, Sweden	1907	Nominated by Otto Pettersson (1848–1941) the only time.
	William Crookes	17 June 1832; London, England	4 April 1919; London, England	1907, 1908, 1909, 1910, 1918	Nominated for the Nobel Prize in Physics too.
	Samuel Eyde	29 October 1866; Arendal, Norway	21 June 1940; Åsgårdstrand, Horten, Norway	1907, 1909, 1913	
	Kristian Birkeland	13 December 1867; Oslo, Norway	15 June 1917; Tokyo, Japan	1907, 1909, 1912, 1913	Nominated for the Nobel Prize in Physics too.
	Heinrich Caro	13 February 1834; Poznań, Poland	11 September 1910; Dresden, Saxony, Germany	1907, 1910	
	Adolph Frank	20 January 1834; Klötze, Saxony-Anhalt, Germany	30 May 1916; Berlin, Germany	1907, 1909, 1910, 1916	
	Theodor Curtius	27 May 1857; Duisburg, North Rhine-Westphalia, Germany	8 February 1928; Heidelberg, Baden-Württemberg, Germany	1907, 1908, 1909, 1910, 1912, 1913, 1914, 1916, 1917, 1919, 1921, 1922, 1923, 1924	
	Albin Haller	7 March 1849; Fellering, Haut-Rhin, France	29 April 1925; Paris, France	1907, 1911, 1912, 1913, 1914, 1915, 1916, 1918, 1919, 1920, 1921, 1922, 1923, 1924, 1925	
1908
	Richard Willstätter	13 August 1872; Karlsruhe, Baden-Württemberg, Germany	3 August 1942; Muralto, Ticino, Switzerland	1908, 1909, 1911, 1912, 1913, 1914, 1915, 1916	Awarded the 1915 Nobel Prize in Chemistry. (Note: "for his researches on plant pigments, especially chlorophyll")
	Frederick Soddy	2 September 1877; Eastbourne, East Sussex, England	22 September 1956; Brighton, East Sussex, England	1908, 1918, 1919, 1922	Awarded the 1921 Nobel Prize in Chemistry (Note: "for his contributions to our knowledge of the chemistry of radioactive substances, and his investigations into the origin and nature of isotopes") in 1922 and nominated for the Nobel Prize in Physics too.
	Albrecht Kossel	16 September 1853; Rostock, Mecklenburg-Vorpommern, Germany	5 July 1927; Heidelberg, Baden-Württemberg, Germany	1908	Awarded the 1910 Nobel Prize in Physiology or Medicine.
	Gustaf de Laval	9 May 1845; Orsa, Sweden	2 February 1913; Stockholm, Sweden	1908	Nominated by Otto Pettersson (1848–1941) the only time and for the Nobel Prize in Physics too.
	Georg Lunge	15 September 1839; Wrocław, Lower Silesia, Poland	3 January 1923; Zürich, Switzerland	1908, 1909	
	Arthur Rudolf Hantzsch	7 March 1857; Dresden, Saxony, Germany	14 March 1935; Dresden, Saxony, Germany	1908, 1918, 1923, 1927	
1909
	Edmund Oscar von Lippmann	9 January 1857; Vienna, Austria	24 September 1940; Halle (Saale), Saxony-Anhalt, Germany	1909	Nominated by Alexander Herzfeld (1854–1928) the only time.
	Ernst Schulze	31 July 1840; Bovenden, Lower Saxony, Germany	15 June 1912; Zürich, Switzerland	1909	Nominated by Ernst Winterstein (1865–1949) the only time.
	Hans Heinrich Landolt	5 December 1831; Zürich, Switzerland	15 March 1910; Berlin, Germany	1909, 1910	
	Otto Schönherr	1 December 1861; Chemnitz, Saxony, Germany	25 December 1926; Dresden, Saxony, Germany	1909, 1910, 1912	
	Karl Engler	5 January 1842; Weisweil, Baden-Württemberg, Germany	7 February 1925; Karlsruhe, Baden-Württemberg, Germany	1909, 1910, 1911, 1916	
	Jean-Baptiste Senderens	27 January 1856; Barbachen, Hautes-Pyrénées, France	26 September 1937; Barbachen, Hautes-Pyrénées, France	1909, 1928, 1929	
	Gabriel Bertrand	17 May 1867; Paris, France	10 June 1962; Paris, France	1909, 1928, 1929, 1931, 1932, 1933, 1934, 1935, 1937, 1942, 1944, 1946, 1947, 1948, 1949, 1950, 1955, 1957	Nominated for Nobel Prize in Physiology or Medicine too

=== 1910–1919 ===
Picture	Name	Born	Died	Years nominated	Notes
1910
	Heike Kamerlingh Onnes	September 21, 1853; Groningen, Netherlands	February 21, 1926; Leiden, Netherlands	1910, 1911	Won the 1913 Nobel Prize in Physics.
	James Dewar	September 20, 1842; Kincardine, Scotland	March 27, 1923; London, England	1903, 1908, 1910, 1911	Nominated for the Nobel Prize in Physics too
	Carl Theodore Liebermann	February 23, 1842; Berlin, Germany	December 28, 1914; Berlin, Germany	1910	Nominated jointly with Otto Wallach the only time by B.Tollens.
	Pierre-Émile Martin	August 18, 1824; Bourges, France	May 21, 1915; Fourchambault, France	1910	
	Walther Spring	March 6, 1848; Liège, Belgium	July 17, 1911; Liège, Belgium	1910	Nominated the only time by Jean Léonard Krutwig (1857–1932) from University of Liège.
1911
	Marie Curie	November 7, 1867; Warsaw, Poland	July 4, 1934; Sancellemoz, France	1911	First woman nominated and first woman to win the 1911 Nobel Prize in Chemistry (Note: “in recognition of her services to the advancement of chemistry by the discovery of the elements radium and polonium, by the isolation of radium and the study of the nature and compounds of this remarkable element”) and Laureate of 1903 Nobel Prize in Physics too
	Paul Ehrlich	March 14, 1854; Strzelin, Poland	August 20, 1915; Bad Homburg, Germany	1911	Ehrlich shared the 1908 Nobel Prize in Physiology or Medicine with Il.Il.Metchnikoff, Nominated jointly the only time by Em.Th.Kocher; Hata nominated for Nobel Prize in Physiology or Medicine too First Asian nominated for the Nobel Prize in Chemistry.
	Sahachiro Hata	March 23, 1873; Masuda, Japan	November 22, 1938; Tokyo, Japan	1911	Ehrlich shared the 1908 Nobel Prize in Physiology or Medicine with Il.Il.Metchnikoff, Nominated jointly the only time by Em.Th.Kocher; Hata nominated for Nobel Prize in Physiology or Medicine too First Asian nominated for the Nobel Prize in Chemistry.
	William Henry Perkin Jr.	June 17, 1860; Wembley, England	September 17, 1929; Oxford, England	1911, 1912, 1913, 1914, 1918, 1919, 1920, 1922, 1925, 1929	
	Angelo Angeli	August 20, 1864; Tarcento, Italy	May 31, 1931; Florence, Italy	1911, 1913, 1917, 1918, 1922, 1924, 1926, 1928, 1931	
	Gustav Tammann	June 9, 1861; Kingisepp, Russia	December 17, 1938; Göttingen, Germany	1911, 1915, 1921, 1922, 1923, 1924, 1925, 1926, 1927, 1928, 1929, 1930, 1931, 1933, 1934, 1935, 1936, 1937	
1912
	Fritz Haber	December 9, 1868; Wrocław, Poland	January 29, 1934; Basel, Switzerland	1911, 1912, 1913, 1915, 1916, 1917, 1918, 1919, 1920	Won the 1918 Nobel Prize in Chemistry (Note: “for the synthesis of ammonia from its elements”) in 1919.
	Hilaire de Chardonnet	May 1, 1839; Besançon, France	March 11, 1924; Paris, France	1912	Nominated the only time by H.Ost.
	William Gilbert Mixter	1846; Dixon, Illinois, United States	1936	1912	Self-nomination only
	Floris Osmond	March 10, 1849; Paris, France	June 18, 1912; Saint-Leu-Taverny, France	1912, 1913	Nominated by H.L.Le Chatelier only
	Philippe Barbier	March 2, 1848; Luzy, France	September 18, 1922; Bandol, France	1912, 1920, 1922	
	Georges Urbain	April 12, 1872; Paris, France	November 5, 1938; Paris, France	1912, 1913, 1915, 1916, 1917, 1918, 1920, 1921, 1922, 1923, 1924, 1925, 1926, 1927, 1928, 1929, 1930, 1931, 1932, 1933, 1934, 1936, 1939	
1913
	Richard Adolf Zsigmondy	April 1, 1865; Vienna, Austria	September 23, 1929; Göttingen, Germany	1913, 1915, 1919, 1921, 1922, 1923, 1924, 1925, 1926	Won the 1925 Nobel Prize in Chemistry (Note: “for his demonstration of the heterogenous nature of colloid solutions and for the methods he used, which have since become fundamental in modern colloid chemistry”) in 1926.
	William Küster	September 23, 1863; Leipzig, Germany	March 5, 1929; Stuttgart, Germany	1913	Jointly nominated only and for Nobel Prize in Physiology or Medicine too
	Leon Marchlewski	December 15, 1869; Włocławek, Poland	January 16, 1946; Kraków, Poland	1913	Jointly nominated only and for Nobel Prize in Physiology or Medicine too
	Karol Olszewski	January 29, 1846; Broniszów, Poland	March 24, 1915; Kraków, Poland	1913	Nominated the only time by K.Dziewoński and for the Nobel Prize in Physics too.
	Theodor Zincke	May 19, 1843; Uelzen, Germany	March 17, 1928; Marburg, Germany	1913	Nominated the only time by G.Heller.
	William Francis Hillebrand	December 12, 1853; Honolulu, Kingdom of Hawaii	February 7, 1925; United States	1913, 1914	Nominated by W.C.Böttger only
	Carl Harries	August 5, 1866; Luckenwalde, Germany	November 3, 1923; Berlin, Germany	1913, 1914, 1915, 1917	
	Albert Recoura	January 20, 1862; Grenoble, France	December 21, 1945; Grenoble, France	1913, 1915, 1921, 1922, 1924	Nominated by H.L.Le Chatelier only.
1914 - Prize has been awarded a year later
	Otto Hahn	March 8, 1879; Frankfurt, Germany	July 28, 1968; Göttingen, Germany	1914, 1923, 1924, 1925, 1929, 1930, 1933, 1934, 1936, 1937, 1939, 1941, 1942, 1943, 1944, 1945, 1946	Won the 1944 Nobel Prize in Chemistry (Note: “for his discovery of the fission of heavy nuclei”) in 1945 and nominated for Nobel Prize in Physics too.
	Ernst Schmidt	July 13, 1845; Halle, Germany	July 5, 1921; Marburg, Germany	1914	Nominated the only time by J.Gadamer.
	Alexander Tschirch	October 17, 1856; Guben, Germany	December 2, 1939; Bern, Switzerland	1914, 1917, 1928	
	Paul Walden	July 26, 1863; Rozula, Latvia	January 22, 1957; Gammertingen, Germany	1913, 1914, 1918, 1920, 1922, 1927, 1928, 1934, 1947, 1948, 1954	
1915
	William Henry Bragg	July 2, 1862; Wigton, England	March 12, 1942; London, England	1915	Won the 1915 Nobel Prize in Physics.
	Henry Moseley	November 23, 1887; Weymouth, England	August 10, 1915; Gallipoli, Turkey	1915	Moseley has been killed before the only chance to be rewarded. Nominated jointly with W.H.Bragg the only time by Sv.Arrhenius and for the Nobel Prize in Physics too.
	Charles Galton Darwin	December 18, 1887; Cambridge, England	December 31, 1962; Cambridge, England	1915	Moseley has been killed before the only chance to be rewarded. Nominated jointly with W.H.Bragg the only time by Sv.Arrhenius and for the Nobel Prize in Physics too.
	Édouard Branly	November 23, 1844; Amiens, France	March 24, 1940; Paris, France	1915	Nominated the only time by H.L.Le Chatelier. Nominated for the Nobel Prize in Physics too.
	Eugen Herzfeld	February 23, 1865 Košice, Slovakia	October 1, 1944; Lugano, Switzerland	1915	Nominated the only time by Em.Baur.
	Emanuele Paternò	December 12, 1847; Palermo, Italy	January 17, 1925; Palermo, Italy	1915	Nominated the only time by Alb.Peratoner.
	Emil Abderhalden	March 9, 1877; Oberuzwil, Switzerland	August 5, 1950; Zurich, Switzerland	1915, 1918, 1923	Nominated for Nobel Prize in Physiology or Medicine too
	Jean Baptiste Perrin	September 30, 1870; Lille, France	April 17, 1942; New York City, United States	1915, 1919, 1920, 1922, 1923, 1924, 1925, 1926	Won the 1926 Nobel Prize in Physics.
1916 - this year Prize was not awarded
	Theodor Svedberg	August 30, 1883; Valbo, Sweden	February 25, 1971; Kopparberg, Sweden	1910, 1911, 1915, 1916, 1918, 1919, 1920, 1923, 1924, 1925, 1926	Won the 1926 Nobel Prize in Chemistry (Note: “for his work on disperse systems”) and nominated for Nobel Prize in Physics too.
	Carl Bosch	August 27, 1874; Cologne, Germany	April 26, 1940; Heidelberg, Germany	1915, 1916, 1920, 1926, 1929, 1930, 1931	Shared the 1931 Nobel Prize in Chemistry with Fr.Bergius. (Note: “in recognition of their contributions to the invention and development of chemical high pressure methods”)
	Frank Wigglesworth Clarke	March 19, 1847; Boston, United States	May 23, 1931; Chevy Chase, Maryland, United States	1916	Nominated the only time by Hiram Colver McNeil (1866–1937) from George Washington University.
	Felix Ehrlich	June 1, 1877; Bad Gandersheim, Germany	January 23, 1942; Oborniki Śląskie, Poland	1916	Nominated the only time by Alexander Herzfeld (1854–1928) from Institut für Zuckerindustrie.
	Émile Bourquelot	June 21, 1851; Jandun, France	January 26, 1921; Paris, France	1916, 1921	
	Josef Maria Eder	March 16, 1855; Krems an der Donau, Austria	October 18, 1944; Kitzbuhel, Austria	1915, 1916, 1921	
1917 - this year Prize was not awarded
	Fritz Pregl	September 3, 1869; Ljubljana, Slovenia	December 13, 1930; Graz, Austria	1917, 1922, 1923	Won the 1923 Nobel Prize in Chemistry (Note: “for his invention of the method of micro-analysis of organic substances”) and nominated for Nobel Prize in Physiology or Medicine too.
	Knut Jacob Beskow	January 13, 1876; Stockholm, Sweden	January 28, 1928; Stockholm, Sweden	1917	Jointly nominated the only time by P.Klason
	Arthur Ramén	October 12, 1873; Uppsala, Sweden	September 30, 1926; Stockholm, Sweden	1917	Jointly nominated the only time by P.Klason
	Karl Andreas Hofmann	April 2, 1870; Ansbach, Kingdom of Bavaria	October 15, 1940; Berlin-Charlottenburg, Germany	1917	Nominated the only time by Fr.Dolezalek
	Arthur Michael	August 7, 1853; Buffalo, New York, United States	February 8, 1942; Orlando, Florida, United States	1917, 1922	Nominated by Th.W.Richards only
	Karl Oskar Widman	January 2, 1852; Uppsala, Sweden	August 26, 1930	1917, 1924	Nominated by A.Angeli only
	Philippe-Auguste Guye	June 12, 1862; Geneva, Switzerland	March 27, 1922; Geneva, Switzerland	1917, 1918, 1919, 1920, 1921, 1922	
	Amé Pictet	July 12, 1857; Geneva, Switzerland	March 11, 1937; Geneva, Switzerland	1917, 1920, 1924, 1926, 1929, 1930, 1931, 1932, 1933	
1918 - Prize has been awarded a year later
	Hartog Jacob Hamburger	March 9, 1859; Alkmaar, Netherlands	January 4, 1924; Groningen, Netherlands	1918	Nominated the only time by H.von Euler-Chelpin and for Nobel Prize in Physiology or Medicine too
	Mikhail Tsvet	May 14, 1872; Asti, Italy	June 26, 1919; Voronezh, Russia	1918	Nominated the only time by Cornelis van Wisselingh (1859–1925) from University of Groningen.
	Arthur Louis Day	October 30, 1869; Brookfield, Massachusetts, United States	March 2, 1960; Washington, D.C., United States	1918	Nominated the only time by Fr.M.Jaeger
	Robert Andrews Millikan	March 22, 1868; Morrison, Illinois, United States	December 19, 1953; San Marino, California, United States	1918	Nominated jointly by James Bayard Clark (1869-?) the only time
	Mihajlo Idvorski Pupin	October 4, 1858 (or October 9, 1854); Idvor, now Serbia	March 12, 1935; New York, United States	1918	Nominated jointly by James Bayard Clark (1869-?) the only time
	Wilhelm Schlenk	March 22, 1879; Munich, Germany	April 29, 1943; Tübingen, Germany	1918, 1920, 1924, 1925, 1929	
1919 - this year Prize was not awarded
	Martinus Beijerinck	March 16, 1851; Amsterdam, Netherlands	January 1, 1931; Gorssel, Netherlands	1917, 1918, 1919, 1920	Nominated by S.Orla-Jensen only.
	Edward Curtis Franklin	March 1, 1862; Geary County, Kansas, United States	February 13, 1937; Stanford University, United States	1919, 1921	Nominated by D.St.Jordan only.

*

=== 1920–1929 ===
Picture	Name	Born	Died	Years nominated	Notes
1920 - Prize has been awarded a year later
	Niels Bohr	October 7, 1885; Copenhagen, Denmark	November 18, 1962; Copenhagen, Denmark	1920, 1929	Won the 1922 Nobel Prize in Physics.
	Otto Philipp Fischer	November 28, 1852; Euskirchen, Germany	April 4, 1932; Erlangen, Germany	1920	Nominated the only time by G.Heller.
	Domingo Emilio Noelting	June 8, 1851; Puerto Plata, Dominican Republic	August 6, 1922; Merano, Italy	1920	Nominated the only time by K.Dziewoński.
	Arthur Amos Noyes	September 13, 1866; Newburyport, Massachusetts, United States	June 3, 1936; Pasadena, California, United States	1920, 1927	
	Ossian Aschan	May 16, 1860; Helsinki, Finland	February 25, 1939; Helsinki, Finland	1920, 1922, 1923, 1924, 1925, 1931, 1936	
1921 - Prize has been awarded a year later
	Friedrich Fichter	July 6, 1869; Basel, Switzerland	June 6, 1952; Basel, Switzerland	1921	Nominated the only time jointly with W.H.Nernst by J.Fr.C.Schall
	Ludwig Knorr	December 2, 1859; Munich, Kingdom of Bavaria	June 4, 1921; Jena, Germany	1921	Nominated by B.L.P.Rassow the only time
	Deutsche Chemische Gesellschaft	1867; Berlin, North German Confederation		1921	Nominated by Sv.A.Arrhenius the only time
	Charles Moureu	April 19, 1863; Mourenx, France	June 13, 1929; Biarritz, France	1921, 1929	
	Søren Peter Lauritz Sørensen	January 9, 1868; Havrebjerg, Denmark	February 12, 1939; Copenhagen, Denmark	1921, 1922, 1923, 1924, 1932, 1933, 1934, 1935	Nominated for Nobel Prize in Physiology or Medicine too (Note: "Important studies on proteins.")
	Herbert Freundlich	January 28, 1880; Charlottenburg, Germany	March 30, 1941; Minneapolis, United States	1921, 1928, 1936	
	Moses Gomberg	February 8, 1866; Kropyvnytskyi, Ukraine	February 12, 1947; Ann Arbor, Michigan, United States	1915, 1916, 1921, 1922, 1924, 1927, 1928, 1929, 1938, 1940	
	Sergei Winogradsky	September 1, 1856; Kyiv, Ukraine	February 25, 1953; Brie-Comte-Robert, France	1921, 1952	Nominated for Nobel Prize in Physiology or Medicine too
1922
	Francis William Aston	September 1, 1877; Birmingham, England	November 20, 1945; Cambridge, England	1922, 1923	Won the 1922 Nobel Prize in Chemistry (Note: “for his discovery, by means of his mass spectrograph, of isotopes, in a large number of non-radioactive elements, and for his enunciation of the whole-number rule”) and nominated for Nobel Prize in Physics too.
	Arnold Frederick Holleman	August 28, 1859; Oisterwijk, Netherlands	August 11, 1953; Bloemendaal, Netherlands	1922	Nominated the only time by J.J.Blanksma.
	Carl Auer von Welsbach	September 1, 1858; Vienna, Austria	August 4, 1929; Mölbling, Austria	1918, 1921, 1922, 1923, 1924, 1925, 1929	
	Nikodem Caro	May 23, 1871; Łódź, Poland	June 27, 1935; Zurich, Switzerland	1922, 1932, 1933	
	Gilbert Newton Lewis	October 23, 1875; Weymouth, Massachusetts, United States	March 23, 1946; Berkeley, California, United States	1922, 1924, 1925, 1926, 1929, 1930, 1931, 1932, 1933, 1934, 1935, 1940, 1941, 1942, 1943, 1944, 1946	
1923
	Ladislav Pračka	March 27, 1877; Dolní Jelení, Austria-Hungary	December 9, 1922	1923	Nominated the only time jointly with Ph.A.Guye and P.Walden by Albert Colson (4.3.1853 Varangéville - 12.4.1933 Paris)
	Notgemeinschaft der Deutschen Wissenschaft	October 30, 1920		1923	Nominated for the Nobel Prize in Physics too by Sv.Aug.Arrhenius only
	Henry Siedentopf	September 22, 1872; Bremen, Germany	May 8, 1940; Jena, Germany	1921, 1923, 1924	Nominated jointly with R.Ad.Zsigmondy by W.Ostwald only.
	Frederick Belding Power	March 4, 1853; New York, United States	March 26, 1927; Washington, D.C., United States	1923, 1925	
1924 - this year Prize was not awarded
	Heinrich Otto Wieland	June 4, 1877; Pforzheim, Germany	August 5, 1947; Starnberg, Germany	1924, 1925, 1926, 1927, 1928, 1933, 1934	Won the 1927 Nobel Prize in Chemistry (Note: “for his investigations of the constitution of the bile acids and related substances”) in 1928 and nominated for Nobel Prize in Physiology or Medicine too.
	Hans von Euler-Chelpin	February 15, 1873; Augsburg, Germany	November 6, 1964; Stockholm, Sweden	1924, 1925, 1926, 1927, 1928, 1929	Shared the 1929 Nobel Prize in Chemistry with A.Harden (Note: “for their investigations on the fermentation of sugar and fermentative enzymes”)
	George de Hevesy	August 1, 1885; Budapest, Hungary	July 5, 1966; Freiburg im Breisgau, Germany	1924, 1927, 1929, 1933, 1934, 1935, 1936, 1939, 1940, 1941, 1942, 1943, 1944	Won the 1943 Nobel Prize in Chemistry (Note: “for his work on the use of isotopes as tracers in the study of chemical processes”) in 1944 and nominated for Nobel Prize in Physics and in Physiology or Medicine too.
	Friedrich Emich	September 5, 1860; Graz, Austria	January 22, 1940; Graz, Austria	1924, 1925	Nominated jointly with W.Schlenk by Fr.Pregl only.
	Dirk Coster	October 5, 1889; Amsterdam, Netherlands	February 12, 1950; Groningen, Netherlands	1924, 1927, 1929, 1933	Nominated jointly with G.de Hevesy only.
	Lise Meitner	November 7, 1878; Vienna, Austria	October 27, 1968; Cambridge, England	1924, 1925, 1929, 1930, 1933, 1934, 1936, 1937, 1939, 1941, 1942, 1946, 1947, 1948	Nominated for the Nobel Prize in Physics too.
1925 - Prize has been awarded a year later
	André-Louis Debierne	July 14, 1874; Paris, France	August 31, 1949; Paris, France	1925	Nominated the only time by Albin Haller.
	Johannes Georg Gadamer	April 1, 1867; Waldenburg, Silesia, North German Confederation	April 15, 1928; Marburg, Germany	1925	Nominated the only time jointly with H.K.A.S.von Euler-Chelpin, Th.Svedberg, H.O.Wieland, Ad.O.R.Windaus, R.Ad.Zsigmondy, M.Ern.A.Bodenstein, W.H.Perkin, Jr., W.J.Schlenk and G.H.J.Ap.Tammann by Fr.A.Kötz
	Emil Otto Paul Bruno Ramann	April 30, 1851; Gut Dorotheenthal, German Confederation	January 19, 1926; Munich, Germany	1925	Nominated the only time by Edw.Blanck
	John Jacob Abel	May 19, 1857; Cleveland, United States	May 26, 1938; Baltimore, United States	1925, 1926, 1927, 1930	Nominated for Nobel Prize in Physiology or Medicine too
1926
	Adolf Windaus	December 25, 1876; Berlin, Germany	June 9, 1959; Göttingen, Germany	1925, 1926, 1927, 1928, 1929	Won the 1928 Nobel Prize in Chemistry (Note: “for the services rendered through his research into the constitution of the sterols and their connection with the vitamins”) and nominated for Nobel Prize in Physiology or Medicine too.
	Fritz Foerster	February 22, 1866; Zielona Góra, Poland	September 14, 1931; Dresden, Germany	1926	Nominated jointly with H.O.Wieland the only time by L.H.Plate.
	Piero Ginori Conti	June 3, 1865; Florence, Italy	December 3, 1939; Florence, Italy	1926	Nominated the only time by P.Sabatier.
	Giuseppe Oddo	June 9, 1865; Caltavuturo, Italy	November 5, 1954; Palermo, Italy	1921, 1926, 1935	Nominated by himself or by his brother B.Oddo only.
	Casimir Funk	February 23, 1884; Warsaw, Poland	November 19, 1967; New York City, United States	1926, 1946	Nominated for Nobel Prize in Physiology or Medicine too
	Paul Pascal	July 4, 1880; Saint-Pol-sur-Ternoise, France	January 26, 1968; Caen, France	1926, 1927, 1949, 1957, 1958, 1960	
1927 - Prize has been awarded a year later
	Irving Langmuir	January 31, 1881; Brooklyn, United States	August 16, 1957; Woods Hole, Massachusetts, United States	1927, 1928, 1929, 1931, 1932	Won the 1932 Nobel Prize in Chemistry (Note: “for his discoveries and investigations in surface chemistry”) and nominated for Nobel Prize in Physics too.
	Peter Debye	March 24, 1884; Maastricht, Netherlands	November 2, 1966; New York City, United States	1927, 1928, 1929, 1931, 1932, 1933, 1934, 1935, 1936	Won the 1936 Nobel Prize in Chemistry (Note: “for his contributions to our knowledge of molecular structure through his investigations on dipole moments and on the diffraction of X-rays and electrons in gases”) and nominated for Nobel Prize in Physics too.
	Frederick Gowland Hopkins	June 20, 1861; Eastbourne, England	May 16, 1947; Cambridge, England	1927	Won the 1929 Nobel Prize in Physiology or Medicine.
	Herbert Baker	June 9, 1862; Owletts, England	February 4, 1946; Cobham, Kent, England	1927	Nominated jointly the only time by C.Drucker
	Ernst Cohen	March 7, 1869; Amsterdam, Netherlands	March 6, 1944; Oswiecim, Poland	1927	Nominated jointly the only time by C.Drucker
	Olof Hammarsten	August 21, 1841; Norrköping, Sweden	September 21, 1932; Uppsala, Sweden	1911, 1914, 1915, 1927	Nominated for Nobel Prize in Physiology or Medicine too
	Julius Bredt	March 29, 1855; Berlin, Germany	September 21, 1937; Aachen, Germany	1924, 1927	Nominated the only time by G.Heller.
	Kurt Gustav Peters	August 17, 1897; Vienna, Austria	May 23, 1978; Vienna, Austria	1927	Nominated jointly with Fr.Paneth the only time by M.J.L.Le Blanc.
	Friedrich Paneth	August 31, 1887; Vienna, Austria	September 17, 1958; Mainz, Germany	1927, 1932, 1935, 1939, 1948, 1952, 1953, 1954, 1955, 1956, 1957, 1958	
	Niels Bjerrum	March 11, 1879; Copenhagen, Denmark	September 30, 1958; Copenhagen, Denmark	1927, 1931, 1956	
1928
	Robert Robinson	September 13, 1886; Derbyshire, England	February 8, 1975; Great Missenden, England	1928, 1933, 1935, 1936, 1938, 1939, 1940, 1941, 1942, 1943, 1944, 1945, 1946, 1947	Won the 1947 Nobel Prize in Chemistry. (Note: “for his investigations on plant products of biological importance, especially the alkaloids”)
	Samuel Colville Lind	June 15, 1879; McMinnville, Tennessee, United States	February 12, 1965; Clinch River near Oak Ridge, Tennessee, United States	1928	Nominated the only time by Colin Garfield Fink (1881–1953) - the President and the Secretary of the Electrochemical Society.
	Kazimierz Fajans	May 27, 1887; Warsaw, Poland	May 18, 1975; Michigan, United States	1924, 1928, 1934	Nominated for the Nobel Prize in Physics too
	Bruno Tacke	August 26, 1861; Wissen, Germany	October 28, 1942; Hagen, Germany	1928, 1936	Nominated by P.Ehrenberg only.
	Hans Fischer	July 27, 1881; Frankfurt, Germany	March 31, 1945; Munich, Germany	1928, 1929, 1930	Won the 1930 Nobel Prize in Chemistry (Note: “for his researches into the constitution of haemin and chlorophyll and especially for his synthesis of haemin”) and nominated for Nobel Prize in Physiology or Medicine too.
1929
	Alfred Fabian Hess	October 9, 1875; New York City, United States	December 5, 1933; The Bronx, United States	1929	Nominated jointly with H.Fischer the only time by J.Wagner-Jauregg and for Nobel Prize in Physiology or Medicine too
	Arthur Harden	October 12, 1865; Manchester, England	June 17, 1940; Wooburn Green, England	1929	Shared the 1929 Nobel Prize in Chemistry with H.von Euler-Chelpin
	Friedrich Bergius	October 11, 1884; Wrocław, Poland	March 30, 1949; Buenos Aires, Argentina	1929, 1931	Shared the 1931 Nobel Prize in Chemistry with C.Bosch.
	Walter Norman Haworth	March 19, 1883; White Coppice, England	March 19, 1950; Barnt Green, England	1929, 1930, 1931, 1934, 1935, 1936, 1937	Shared the 1937 Nobel Prize in Chemistry (Note: “for his investigations on carbohydrates and vitamin C”) with P.Karrer.
	Otto Heinrich Warburg	October 8, 1883; Freiburg im Breisgau, Germany	August 1, 1970; Berlin, Germany	1929, 1931, 1960	Won the 1931 Nobel Prize in Physiology or Medicine.
	George Barger	April 4, 1878; Manchester, England	January 6, 1939; Aeschi, Switzerland	1929	Nominated jointly the only time and for Nobel Prize in Physiology or Medicine too
	Charles Harington	August 1, 1897; Llanerfyl, Wales	February 4, 1972; London, England	1929	Nominated jointly the only time and for Nobel Prize in Physiology or Medicine too
	Kurt Bennewitz	January 2, 1886; Magdeburg, Germany	November 28, 1964; Bonn, Germany	1929	Nominated the only time by J.Billiter.
	Johannes van Laar	July 10, 1860; The Hague, Netherlands	December 9, 1938; Clarens, Switzerland	1929	Nominated the only time by J.J.Blanksma.
	Alfred Stock	July 16, 1876; Gdańsk, Poland	August 12, 1946; Aken (Elbe), Germany	1929	Nominated the only time by Alfons Franz Klemenc (1885–1960) from TU Wien.
	Heinrich Hubert Maria Josef Houben	October 27, 1875; Waldfeucht, Germany	June 28, 1940; Tübingen, Germany	1929	Self-nomination the only time
	Carl Neuberg	July 29, 1877; Hanover, Germany	May 30, 1956; New York City, United States	1921, 1929, 1930, 1931, 1932, 1933, 1934, 1935	Nominated for Nobel Prize in Physiology or Medicine too
	Frédéric Swarts	September 2, 1866; Ixelles, Belgium	September 6, 1940; Ghent, Belgium	1926, 1929, 1932, 1933, 1935	
	Max Bodenstein	July 15, 1871; Magdeburg, Germany	September 3, 1942; Berlin, Germany	1925, 1929, 1930, 1931, 1932, 1933, 1934, 1935, 1936, 1937	
	Otto Ruff	December 12, 1871; Baden-Württemberg, Germany	September 17, 1939; Wrocław, Poland	1929, 1930, 1931, 1932, 1933, 1934, 1935, 1936, 1937	
	Victor Goldschmidt	January 27, 1888; Zurich, Switzerland	March 20, 1947; Oslo, Norway	1929, 1930, 1931, 1932, 1933, 1934, 1936, 1940	
	Johannes Nicolaus Brønsted	February 22, 1879; Varde, Denmark	December 17, 1947; Copenhagen, Denmark	1929, 1933, 1948, 1949	
	Charles Dufraisse	August 20, 1885; Excideuil, France	August 5, 1969; Excideuil, France	1929, 1948, 1950, 1952, 1954, 1956, 1958	

=== 1930–1939 ===
Picture	Name	Born	Died	Years nominated	Notes
1930
	Percy Williams Bridgman	April 21, 1882; Cambridge, Massachusetts, United States	August 20, 1961; Randolph, New Hampshire, United States	1930	Won the 1946 Nobel Prize in Physics.
	Carl F. Schmidt	July 29, 1893; Lebanon, Pennsylvania, United States	April 4, 1988; Radnor Township, Delaware County, Pennsylvania, United States	1930	
	Werner Karl Heisenberg	December 5, 1901; Würzburg, German Empire	February 1, 1976; Munich, Germany	1930, 1931	Nominated jointly with Arn.Th.Eucken and K.-Fr.Bonhoeffer only by J.B.Perrin
	Arnold Thomas Eucken	July 3, 1884; Jena, Germany	June 16, 1950; Seebruck, Germany	1930, 1931, 1934	Nominated jointly with K.-Fr.Bonhoeffer only.
	Karl-Friedrich Bonhoeffer	January 13, 1899; Wrocław, Poland	May 15, 1957; Göttingen, Germany	1930, 1931, 1934, 1937, 1952	Nominated for the Nobel Prize in Physics too.
1931
	Leopold Ružička	September 13, 1887; Vukovar, Croatia	September 26, 1976; Mammern, Switzerland	1931, 1933, 1935, 1936, 1937, 1938, 1939	Shared the 1939 Nobel Prize in Chemistry (Note: “for his work on polymethylenes and higher terpenes”) with Ad.Fr.J.Butenandt.
	Hermann Staudinger	March 23, 1881; Worms, Germany	September 8, 1965; Freiburg im Breisgau, Germany	1931, 1932, 1934, 1935, 1939, 1941, 1946, 1947, 1948, 1949, 1950, 1951, 1952, 1953	Won the 1953 Nobel Prize in Chemistry (Note: “for his discoveries in the field of macromolecular chemistry”)
	Werner Schulemann	May 4, 1888; Nysa, Poland	June 20, 1975; Bonn, Germany	1931	Nominated the only time by H.K.G.Schmidt and for Nobel Prize in Physiology or Medicine too
	Karl von Auwers	September 16, 1863; Gotha, Germany	May 3, 1939; Marburg, Germany	1931	
	Nicola Parravano	July 21, 1883; Fontana Liri, Kingdom of Italy	August 10, 1938; Fiuggi, Kingdom of Italy	1931	
	Frederick George Donnan	September 6, 1870; Colombo, Sri Lanka	December 16, 1956; Canterbury, England	1931, 1933	
	Peter Klason	April 4, 1848; Falkenberg, Sweden	January 1, 1937; Stockholm, Sweden	1931, 1932, 1934, 1935	
	James Irvine	May 9, 1877; Glasgow, Scotland	June 12, 1952; Edinburgh, Scotland	1931, 1935, 1936	Nominated jointly with W.N.Haworth only.
	Werner Kuhn	February 6, 1899; Maur, Switzerland	August 27, 1963; Basel, Switzerland	1931, 1952, 1956, 1957, 1958, 1959, 1960, 1961, 1962, 1963, 1964	
1932
	Paul Karrer	April 21, 1889; Moscow, Russia	June 18, 1971; Zurich, Switzerland	1932, 1933, 1934, 1935, 1936, 1937	Shared the 1937 Nobel Prize in Chemistry (Note: “for his investigations on carotenoids, flavins and vitamins A and B2”) with Walter Norman Haworth.
	Richard Kuhn	December 3, 1900; Vienna, Austria	August 1, 1967; Heidelberg, Germany	1932, 1935, 1936, 1937, 1939	Won the 1938 Nobel Prize in Chemistry (Note: “for his work on carotenoids and vitamins”) in 1939.
	Otto Diels	January 23, 1876; Hamburg, Germany	March 7, 1954; Kiel, Germany	1931, 1932, 1933, 1934, 1935, 1936, 1937, 1942, 1943, 1944, 1949, 1950	Shared the 1950 Nobel Prize in Chemistry with K.Alder (Note: “for their discovery and development of the diene synthesis”)
	Gustav Embden	November 10, 1874; Hamburg, Germany	July 25, 1933; Nassau, Rhineland-Palatinate, Germany	1932	Nominated jointly with C.Neuberg the only time by H.von Euler-Chelpin and for Nobel Prize in Physiology or Medicine too
	Walter Noddack	August 17, 1893; Berlin, Germany	December 7, 1960; Berlin, Germany	1932, 1933, 1934, 1935, 1937	
1933 - this year Prize was not awarded
	Ida Tacke Noddack	February 25, 1896; Rhine Province, Germany	September 24, 1978; Bad Neuenahr-Ahrweiler, Germany	1933, 1935, 1937	Nominated jointly with W.Noddack only.
	Artturi Ilmari Virtanen	January 15, 1895; Helsinki, Finland	November 11, 1973; Helsinki, Finland	1933, 1934, 1935, 1936, 1937, 1938, 1939, 1941, 1942, 1943, 1944, 1945	Won the 1945 Nobel Prize in Chemistry (Note: “for his research and inventions in agricultural and nutrition chemistry, especially for his fodder preservation method”)
	Ernst Späth	May 14, 1886; Moravský Beroun, Czech Republic	September 30, 1946; Zurich, Switzerland	1933	Nominated jointly with P.Karrer the only time by K.Brass.
	Emil Votoček	October 5, 1872; Hostinné, Czech Republic	October 11, 1950; Prague, Czech Republic	1933	
1934
	Adolf Butenandt	March 24, 1903; Bremerhaven, Germany	January 18, 1995; Munich, Germany	1934, 1935, 1936, 1938, 1939	Shared the 1939 Nobel Prize in Chemistry (Note: “for his work on sex hormones”) with L.Ružička and nominated for Nobel Prize in Physiology or Medicine too.
	Jaroslav Heyrovský	December 20, 1890; Prague, Czech Republic	March 27, 1967; Prague, Czech Republic	1934, 1938, 1940, 1944, 1947, 1950, 1952, 1953, 1954, 1955, 1956, 1957, 1958, 1959	Won the 1959 Nobel Prize in Chemistry (Note: “for his discovery and development of the polarographic methods of analysis”) and nominated for Nobel Prize in Physics and in Physiology or Medicine too.
	Harold Clayton Urey	April 29, 1893; Walkerton, Indiana, United States	January 5, 1981; La Jolla, California, United States	1934	Won the 1934 Nobel Prize in Chemistry (Note: “for his discovery of heavy hydrogen”) and nominated for Nobel Prize in Physics too.
	Edward Wight Washburn	May 10, 1881; Beatrice, Nebraska, United States	February 6, 1934; Washington, D.C., United States	1934	Nominated jointly with H.Cl.Urey the only time by Th.Svedberg. Died before the only chance to be rewarded.
	Discoverers of Heavy Water			1934	Nominated by W.Dilthey the only time
	Louis Camille Maillard	February 4, 1878; Pont-à-Mousson, France	May 12, 1936; Paris, France	1934	Nominated the only time by R.Maire.
	Fritz Micheel	July 3, 1900; Strasburg, Germany	June 8, 1982; Münster, Germany	1934	Nominated jointly with W.N.Haworth, P.Karrer and Edm.L.Hirst by W.Dilthey the only time
	David Reichinstein	June 9, 1882; Mogilev, Belarus	November 4, 1955; Zurich, Switzerland	1934	Nominated jointly with W.N.Haworth, P.Karrer and Edm.L.Hirst by W.Dilthey the only time
	Albert Imre Szent-Györgyi	September 16, 1893; Budapest, Austria-Hungary	October 22, 1986; Woods Hole, Massachusetts, United States	1934	Nominated jointly with W.N.Haworth, P.Karrer and Edm.L.Hirst by W.Dilthey the only time
	Fritz Kögl	September 19, 1897; Munich, Germany	June 6, 1959; Utrecht, Netherlands	1934, 1935, 1936, 1937, 1940, 1941, 1943, 1944, 1945, 1948, 1949, 1950, 1951	Nominated for Nobel Prize in Physiology or Medicine too
	Erik Karl Mauritz Hägglund	June 15, 1887; Timrå, Sweden	March 13, 1959; Stockholm, Sweden	1934, 1956	
1935
	Frédéric Joliot	March 19, 1900; Paris, France	August 14, 1958; Paris, France	1935, 1936	Shared the 1935 Nobel Prize in Chemistry (Note: “in recognition of their synthesis of new radioactive elements”) and nominated for Nobel Prize in Physics too
	Irène Joliot-Curie	September 12, 1897; Paris, France	March 17, 1956; Paris, France	1935, 1936	Shared the 1935 Nobel Prize in Chemistry and nominated for Nobel Prize in Physics too
	Enrico Fermi	September 9, 1901; Rome, Italy	November 28, 1954; Chicago, United States	1935, 1936, 1937	Won the 1938 Nobel Prize in Physics.
	George Oliver Curme Jr.	December 24, 1888; Mount Vernon, Iowa, United States	July 28, 1976; Oak Bluffs, Massachusetts, United States	1935	Nominated jointly with Ph.Levene the only time by M.T.Bogert.
	Phoebus Levene	February 25, 1869; Žagarė, Lithuania	September 6, 1940; New York City, United States	1935	Nominated jointly with G.Ol.Curme Jr. the only time by M.T.Bogert and for Nobel Prize in Physiology or Medicine too
	Colin Garfield Fink	December 31, 1881; Hoboken, New Jersey, United States	September 17, 1953; Red Bank, New Jersey, United States	1935	Nominated the only time by Harold Hibbert (1877–1945) from McGill University.
	Max Bergmann	February 12, 1886; Fürth, Germany	November 7, 1944; New York City, United States	1935, 1940	Nominated by K.Landsteiner only.
1936
	William Giauque	May 12, 1895; Niagara Falls, Canada	March 28, 1982; Berkeley, California, United States	1936, 1937, 1942, 1947, 1948, 1949	Won the 1949 Nobel Prize in Chemistry (Note: “for his contributions in the field of chemical thermodynamics, particularly concerning the behaviour of substances at extremely low temperatures”) and nominated for Nobel Prize in Physics too.
	Kurt Alder	July 10, 1902; Chorzów, Poland	June 20, 1958; Cologne, Germany	1936, 1942, 1943, 1944, 1949, 1950	Shared the 1950 Nobel Prize in Chemistry with O.Diels.
	Umetaro Suzuki	April 7, 1874; Shizuoka, Japan	September 20, 1943; Tokyo, Japan	1927, 1936	Nominated for Nobel Prize in Physiology or Medicine too
	William Arthur Bone	March 19, 1871; Stockton-on-Tees, England	June 11, 1938; London, England	1936	Nominated the only time by James Charles Philip (1873–1941) from Imperial College London.
	Jacob Heslinga	August 24, 1896; Pingjum, Netherlands	1966	1936	Nominated jointly the only time by J.J.Blanksma
	Henri ter Meulen	November 30, 1871; Amsterdam, Netherlands	June 24, 1942; The Hague, Netherlands	1936	Nominated jointly the only time by J.J.Blanksma
	Otto Hönigschmid	March 13, 1878; Hořovice, Czech Republic	October 14, 1945; Munich, Germany	1936	Nominated the only time by Hermann Pauly.
	Jens Möller	July 2, 1894; Warnitz, Denmark	November 28, 1951; Gråsten, Denmark	1936	Nominated the only time by P.E.Raaschou.
	IG Farben's research laboratory, Elberfeld	December 2, 1925; Germany	October 31, 2012; Germany	1936	Nominated the only time by J.Wagner-Jauregg
	Wojciech Świętosławski	June 21, 1881; Kiryjówka, Poland	April 29, 1968; Warsaw, Poland	1936, 1950, 1957, 1958, 1960, 1962	
1937
	Hugo Theorell	July 6, 1903; Linköping, Sweden	August 15, 1982; Stockholm, Sweden	1937, 1938, 1952, 1953, 1954, 1955	Won the 1955 Nobel Prize in Physiology or Medicine.
	Marc Tiffeneau	November 5, 1873; Mouy, France	May 20, 1945; Paris, France	1937	Nominated the only time by Jean-Louis Chelle (1881–1960) from University of Bordeaux.
	Arthur Heinrich Binz	November 12, 1868; Bonn, Germany	January 25, 1943; Berlin, Germany	1937	Professors of Chemistry from the Agricultural College in Berlin nominated jointly the only time by Hans Albert Bausch.
	Curt Räth	December 1, 1893; Schöneberg, Germany	November 29, 1944; Charlottenburg, Germany	1937	Professors of Chemistry from the Agricultural College in Berlin nominated jointly the only time by Hans Albert Bausch.
	Franz Joseph Emil Fischer	March 19, 1877; Freiburg im Breisgau, Germany	December 1, 1947; Munich, Germany	1937	Nominated jointly with Fr.Hofmann the only time by Ernst Terres.
	Fritz Hofmann	November 2, 1866; Kölleda, Germany	October 29, 1956; Hanover, Germany	1937	
	Gustaf Komppa	July 28, 1867; Vyborg, Russia	January 20, 1949; Helsinki, Finland	1937, 1942, 1943, 1944, 1945	
	Fritz London	March 7, 1900; Breslau, now Poland	March 30, 1954; Durham, North Carolina, United States	1937, 1942, 1950, 1963	Nominated for the Nobel Prize in Physics too.
	Paul Harteck	July 20, 1902; Vienna, Austria	January 22, 1985; Santa Barbara, California, United States	1937, 1952, 1972	
1938 - Prize has been awarded a year later
	Wendell Meredith Stanley	August 16, 1904; Ridgeville, Indiana, United States	June 15, 1971; Salamanca, Spain	1938, 1939, 1941, 1942, 1943, 1944, 1945, 1946	Shared the 1946 Nobel Prize in Chemistry with J.H.Northrop (Note: “for their preparation of enzymes and virus proteins in a pure form”) and J.B.Sumner and nominated for Nobel Prize in Physiology or Medicine too.
	William Draper Harkins	December 28, 1873; Titusville, Pennsylvania, United States	March 7, 1951; Chicago, United States	1933, 1938	
	Jacob Böeseken	August 20, 1868; Rotterdam, Netherlands	May 16, 1949; Delft, Netherlands	1938	Nominated the only time by H. ter Meulen
	Victor Henri	June 6, 1872; Marseille, France	June 21, 1940; La Rochelle, France	1938	Nominated the only time by J.Errera.
	Vladimir Ipatieff	November 21, 1867; Moscow, Russia	November 29, 1952; Chicago, United States	1938, 1941, 1942, 1948, 1949, 1950	
	Arthur Stoll	January 8, 1887; Schinznach-Dorf, Switzerland	January 13, 1971; Dornach, Switzerland	1938, 1940, 1942, 1950, 1951, 1952, 1953, 1954, 1957, 1959, 1960	Nominated for Nobel Prize in Physiology or Medicine too
1939
	Georg Bredig	October 1, 1868; Glogow, Poland	April 24, 1944; New York City, United States	1922, 1939	
	Frederick Charles Bawden	August 18, 1908; Devonshire, England	February 8, 1972; Hertfordshire, England	1939	Nominated jointly the only time by Th.Svedberg and for Nobel Prize in Physiology or Medicine too
	Norman Pirie	July 1, 1907; Easebourne, England	March 29, 1997; Harpenden, England	1939	Nominated jointly the only time by Th.Svedberg and for Nobel Prize in Physiology or Medicine too
	Paul Job	December 4, 1886; Nancy, France	July 29, 1957; Paris, France	1939	Nominated the only time by Marcel Lemarchands (1889–1943) from the University of Lyon.
	Maurice Piettre	January 14, 1878; Paris, France	January 13, 1954; Paris, France	1939	Nominated the only time by L.de Broglie.
	Francesco Giordani	July 5, 1896; Naples, Italy	January 24, 1961; Naples, Italy	1939	
	Dorothy Maud Wrinch	September 12, 1894; Rosario, Argentina	February 11, 1976; Falmouth, Massachusetts, United States	1939	
	Conrad Elvehjem	May 27, 1901; McFarland, Wisconsin, United States	July 27, 1962; Madison, Wisconsin, United States	1939, 1944	Nominated for Nobel Prize in Physiology or Medicine too
	Ernest Fourneau	October 4, 1872; Biarritz, France	August 5, 1949; Ascain, France	1939, 1940, 1949	
	Robley Cook Williams	October 13, 1908; Santa Rosa, California, United States	January 3, 1995; New York City, United States	1939, 1940, 1945, 1948, 1956	Nominated for Nobel Prize in Physiology or Medicine too

=== 1940–1949 ===
Picture	Name	Born	Died	Years nominated	Notes
1940 - this year Prize was not awarded
	Linus Pauling	February 28, 1901; Portland, Oregon, United States	August 19, 1994; Big Sur, United States	1940, 1941, 1943, 1944, 1946, 1948, 1949, 1950, 1951, 1952, 1953, 1954, 1955	Won the 1954 Nobel Prize in Chemistry (Note: “for his research into the nature of the chemical bond and its application to the elucidation of the structure of complex substances”) and the 1962 Nobel Peace Prize. Nominated for the Nobel Prize in Physiology or Medicine too.
	Fritz Weigert	September 18, 1876; Berlin, Germany	April 13, 1947; Berlin, Germany	1940	Nominated the only time by H.von Halban.
	Jacques Tréfouël	November 9, 1897; Le Raincy, France	July 11, 1977; Paris, France	1940, 1944, 1946, 1950, 1951	Nominated for Nobel Prize in Physiology or Medicine too
	Christopher Kelk Ingold	October 28, 1893; London, England	December 8, 1970; Edgware, England	1940, 1948, 1949, 1950, 1951, 1953, 1954, 1955, 1956, 1957, 1958, 1959, 1960, 1961, 1962, 1963, 1964, 1965, 1966, 1967, 1968, 1969, 1970, 1971, 1972	
	John Howard Northrop	July 5, 1891; Yonkers, New York, United States	May 27, 1987; Wickenburg, Arizona, United States	1940, 1941, 1942, 1943, 1944, 1945, 1946	Shared the 1946 Nobel Prize in Chemistry with W.M.Stanley and nominated for the Nobel Prize in Physiology or Medicine too. (Note: “for his discovery that enzymes can be crystallized”)
1941 - this year Prize was not awarded					Shared the 1946 Nobel Prize in Chemistry with W.M.Stanley and nominated for the Nobel Prize in Physiology or Medicine too.
	James Batcheller Sumner	November 19, 1887; Canton, Massachusetts, United States	August 12, 1955; Buffalo, New York, United States	1941, 1944, 1945, 1946	Shared the 1946 Nobel Prize in Chemistry with W.M.Stanley and nominated for the Nobel Prize in Physiology or Medicine too.
	Moses Kunitz	December 19, 1887; Slonim, Belarus	April 21, 1978; Philadelphia, United States	1941	Nominated jointly with J.H.Northrop and J.B.Sumner only and for Nobel Prize in Physiology or Medicine too
	Rudolph Schoenheimer	May 10, 1898; Berlin, Germany	September 11, 1941; Yonkers, New York, United States	1941	Nominated jointly with G.Ch.de Hevesy the only time by H.Urey and for Nobel Prize in Physiology or Medicine too
	Paul Niggli	June 26, 1888; Zofingen, Switzerland	January 13, 1953; Zurich, Switzerland	1941	
	Donald Van Slyke	March 29, 1883; Pike, New York, United States	May 4, 1971; Brookhaven, New York, United States	1941, 1945	Nominated for Nobel Prize in Physiology or Medicine too
	Albert Marcel Germain René Portevin	November 1, 1880; Paris, France	April 12, 1962; Paris, France	1941, 1945, 1948, 1950, 1959	Nominated by G.-L.Chaudron only and for the Nobel Prize in Physics too.
1942 - this year Prize was not awarded
	René Bernard Wurmser	September 24, 1890; Paris, France	November 9, 1993; Paris, France	1942	Nominated the only time by J.B.Perrin.
	Ernest Kennaway	May 23, 1881; Exeter, England	January 1, 1958; London, England	1942, 1944	Nominated jointly with J.W.Cook only and for Nobel Prize in Physiology or Medicine too
	James Wilfred Cook	December 10, 1900; South Kensington, England	October 21, 1975; Exeter, England	1942, 1944, 1950, 1952	Nominated jointly with J.W.Cook only and for Nobel Prize in Physiology or Medicine too
	Walter Heitler	January 2, 1904; Karlsruhe, Germany	November 15, 1981; Zollikon, Switzerland	1942, 1950, 1959, 1963, 1964, 1969, 1970	Nominated for the Nobel Prize in Physics too.
1943 - Prize has been awarded a year later
	Tadeusz Reichstein	July 20, 1897; Włocławek, Poland	August 1, 1996; Basel, Switzerland	1943, 1944, 1945, 1947, 1948, 1949, 1950	Shared the 1950 Nobel Prize in Physiology or Medicine with Edw.C.Kendall and Ph.Sh.Hench.
1944 - Prize has been awarded a year later
	Vincent du Vigneaud	May 18, 1901; Chicago, United States	December 11, 1978; White Plains, New York, United States	1944, 1945, 1947, 1948, 1949, 1950, 1951, 1952, 1954, 1955, 1956	Won the 1955 Nobel Prize in Chemistry (Note: “for his work on biochemically important sulphur compounds, especially for the first synthesis of a polypeptide hormone”) and nominated for the Nobel Prize in Physiology or Medicine too.
	Harry Steenbock	August 16, 1886; Charlestown, Wisconsin, United States	December 25, 1967; Madison, Wisconsin, United States	1944	Nominated the only time by Olaf Andreas Hougen (1893–1986) from the University of Wisconsin–Madison and for Nobel Prize in Physiology or Medicine too
	Edward Charles Dodds	October 13, 1899; Liverpool, England	December 16, 1973; London, England	1944	Nominated jointly with Ern.Kennaway, J.W.Cook, Fr.Kögl and Kl.Clusius the only time by J.B.Gillis and for Nobel Prize in Physiology or Medicine too
	Klaus Clusius	March 19, 1903; Wrocław, Poland	May 28, 1963; Zurich, Switzerland	1944, 1946, 1947, 1948, 1949, 1950, 1951, 1952, 1953, 1954, 1955, 1956, 1957, 1958, 1959, 1961	Nominated for the Nobel Prize in Physics too.
	Karl Paul Link	January 31, 1901; LaPorte, Indiana, United States	November 21, 1978; Madison, Wisconsin, United States	1944, 1960	Nominated for Nobel Prize in Physiology or Medicine too
	Henry Eyring	February 20, 1901; Colonia Juárez, Chihuahua, Mexico	December 26, 1981; Salt Lake City, Utah, Mexico	1944, 1950, 1958, 1959, 1960, 1961, 1963, 1964, 1965, 1968, 1969, 1970, 1971, 1972, 1973, 1974, 1975	(Note: “For his works on the course of chemical reactions; For his works on the theory of chemical reaction rates; For ... contributions to the development of theoretical chemistry”)
1945
	Arne Fredrik Westgren	July 11, 1889; Årjäng, Sweden	March 7, 1975; Stockholm, Sweden	1945	Nominated the only time by Donald Pritchard Smith (1879–1957) from the Princeton University.
1946
	Glenn Theodore Seaborg	April 19, 1912; Ishpeming, Michigan, United States	February 25, 1999; Lafayette, California, United States	1946, 1948, 1949, 1950, 1951, 1955	Shared the 1951 Nobel Prize in Chemistry with Edw.McMillan. (Note: “for their discoveries in the chemistry of the transuranium elements”)
	Robert Burns Woodward	April 10, 1917; Boston, United States	July 8, 1979; Cambridge, Massachusetts, United States	1946, 1947, 1948, 1953, 1954, 1955, 1956, 1957, 1958, 1959, 1960, 1961, 1962, 1963, 1964, 1965	Woodward holds the highest record as the most nominated person for the Nobel Prize in Chemistry and won on 1965. (Note: “for his outstanding achievements in the art of organic synthesis”) He was nominated 111 times.
	Hans Adolf Krebs	August 25, 1900; Hildesheim, Germany	November 22, 1981; Oxford, England	1946, 1950	Won the 1953 Nobel Prize in Physiology or Medicine.
	Hugh Stott Taylor	February 6, 1890; St. Helens, Merseyside, England	April 17, 1974; Princeton, New Jersey, United States	1946	Nominated the only time by N.H.Furman.
	William von Eggers Doering	June 22, 1917; Fort Worth, Texas, United States	January 3, 2011; Waltham, Massachusetts, United States	1946, 1947, 1968, 1972	
	Alexander Frumkin	October 24, 1895; Chișinău, Moldova	May 27, 1976; Tula, Russia	1946, 1962, 1963, 1964, 1965, 1966, 1967, 1968, 1969, 1973, 1974, 1975	(Note: “For his theory of electrochemical processes”)
	Nikolay Semyonov	April 15, 1896; Saratov, Russia	September 25, 1986; Moscow, Russia	1946, 1947, 1948, 1950, 1955, 1956, 1957	Shared the 1956 Nobel Prize in Chemistry (Note: “for their researches into the mechanism of chemical reactions”)
1947					Shared the 1956 Nobel Prize in Chemistry
	Cyril Norman Hinshelwood	June 19, 1897; London, England	October 9, 1967; London, England	1947, 1948, 1949, 1951, 1952, 1953, 1955, 1956	Shared the 1956 Nobel Prize in Chemistry
	Arne Tiselius	August 10, 1902; Stockholm, Sweden	October 29, 1971; Uppsala, Sweden	1947, 1948	Won the 1948 Nobel Prize in Chemistry (Note: “for his research on electrophoresis and adsorption analysis, especially for his discoveries concerning the complex nature of the serum proteins”) and nominated for the Nobel Prize in Physiology or Medicine too.
	Henri Devaux	July 6, 1862; Étaules, Charente-Maritime, France	March 14, 1956; Bordeaux, France	1947	Nominated the only time by L.Genevois.
	Leo Szilard	February 11, 1898; Budapest, Hungary	May 30, 1964; San Diego, California, United States	1947	Nominated the only time by M.Polanyi and for the Nobel Prize in Physics too.
	J.R. Geigy SA (founded by J. R. Geigy-Merian)	1857; Basel, Switzerland	1970; Basel, Switzerland	1947	Nominated jointly with P.Läuger the only time by Bawa Kartar Singh (1886–1960) from the University of the Punjab. First and last company nominated for the Nobel Prize in Chemistry
	Paul Läuger	1896	1959	1947	Nominated jointly with J.R. Geigy SA the only time by Bawa Kartar Singh (1886–1960) from the University of the Punjab and for Nobel Prize in Physiology or Medicine too
	Otto Robert Frisch	October 1, 1904; Vienna, Austria	September 22, 1979; Cambridge, England	1947, 1948	Nominated jointly with L.Meitner by N.Bohr only and for the Nobel Prize in Physics too.
1948
	Edwin McMillan	September 18, 1907; Redondo Beach, California, United States	September 7, 1991; El Cerrito, California, United States	1948, 1951	Shared the 1951 Nobel Prize in Chemistry with Gl.Th.Seaborg and nominated for the Nobel Prize in Physiology or Medicine too.
	Philip Abelson	April 27, 1913; Tacoma, Washington, United States	August 1, 2004; Bethesda, Maryland, United States	1948	Nominated jointly with Edw.McMillan the only time by Don Merlin Lee Yost (1893–1977) from the California Institute of Technology.
	Paul Lebeau	December 19, 1868; Boiscommun, France	November 18, 1959; Massy, Essonne, France	1948	Nominated the only time by L.Hackspill.
	David Rittenberg	November 11, 1906; New York City, United States	January 24, 1970; New York City, United States	1948	Nominated the only time by Egbert Havinga (1909–1988) from Leiden University and for Nobel Prize in Physiology or Medicine too.
	Alfred Mirsky	October 17, 1900; New York City, United States	June 19, 1974; New York City, United States	1948	Nominated the only time by H.K.A.S.von Euler-Chelpin.
	Paul Rabe	August 24, 1869; Hoym, Germany	August 28, 1952; Hamburg, Germany	1948	Nominated jointly with R.B.Woodward the only time by L.Zechmeister.
	Gerhard Dickel	October 28, 1913; Augsburg, Germany	November 3, 2017; Augsburg, Germany	1948	Nominated jointly with Kl.Clusius the only time by H.Urey.
	Joseph William Kennedy	May 30, 1916; Nacogdoches, Texas, United States	May 5, 1957; St. Louis, Missouri, United States	1948	Nominated jointly with Gl.T.Seaborg the only time by H.Urey.
	Pierre Armand Jacquet	April 7, 1906; Saint-Mandé, France	September 6, 1967; Banyuls-sur-Mer, France	1948, 1950	Nominated jointly with Alb.Portevin and Ch.Dufraisse by G.-L.Chaudron only.
	Morris Selig Kharasch	August 24, 1895; Kremenets', Ukraine	October 9, 1957; Copenhagen, Denmark	1948, 1952, 1953, 1954, 1955, 1956, 1957	
	Roger Adams	January 2, 1889; Boston, United States	July 6, 1971; Urbana, Illinois, United States	1948, 1949, 1952, 1957, 1959, 1960	
	Hans Meerwein	May 20, 1879; Hamburg, Germany	October 24, 1965; Marburg, Germany	1948, 1952, 1953, 1954, 1956, 1957, 1958, 1959, 1960, 1961, 1962, 1963, 1964, 1965	
	Arvid Hedvall	January 18, 1888; Skara, Sweden	December 24, 1974; Gothenburg, Sweden	1948, 1949, 1950, 1954, 1955, 1956, 1957, 1958, 1960, 1962, 1969	
	Chester Hamlin Werkman	June 17, 1893; Fort Wayne, Indiana, United States	September 10, 1962; Ames, Iowa, United States	1948, 1949, 1950, 1952	Nominated for Nobel Prize in Physiology or Medicine too Nominated jointly with Ch.H.Werkman only
1949					Nominated for Nobel Prize in Physiology or Medicine too Nominated jointly with Ch.H.Werkman only
	Harland Goff Wood	September 2, 1907; Delavan, Minnesota, United States	September 12, 1991; Cleveland, United States	1949, 1950, 1952	Nominated for Nobel Prize in Physiology or Medicine too Nominated jointly with Ch.H.Werkman only
	Albert Kluyver	June 3, 1888; Breda, Netherlands	May 14, 1956; Delft, Netherlands	1949	Nominated jointly with Ch.H.Werkman the only time by A.I.Virtanen.
	Alexander Robertus Todd	October 2, 1907; Glasgow, Scotland	January 10, 1997; Oakington, England	1949, 1951, 1952, 1953, 1954, 1955, 1956, 1957	Won the 1957 Nobel Prize in Chemistry. (Note: “for his work on nucleotides and nucleotide co-enzymes”)
	Edward Calvin Kendall	March 8, 1886; South Norwalk, United States	May 4, 1972; Princeton, New Jersey, United States	1949	Shared the 1950 Nobel Prize in Physiology or Medicine with T.Reichstein and Ph.Sh.Hench.
	Edwin Joseph Cohn	December 17, 1892; New York City, United States	October 1, 1953; Boston, United States	1949	Nominated the only time by George Scatchard (1892–1973) from Massachusetts Institute of Technology and for Nobel Prize in Physiology or Medicine too
	George William Heise	June 27, 1888; Milwaukee, United States	1972; United States	1949	Nominated the only time by Sherlock Swann Jr. (1900–1983) from University of Illinois at Urbana–Champaign.
	Karl Miescher	January 8, 1892; Naples, Italy	April 14, 1974; Riehen, Switzerland	1949	Nominated the only time by L.Fieser.
	George Malcolm Dyson	April 5, 1902; London, England	December 16, 1978; Loughborough, England	1949	Nominated jointly the only time by Ernest H. Huntress (1899–1970) from Massachusetts Institute of Technology
	Friedrich Richter	September 1, 1896; Berlin, Germany	November 22, 1961; Frankfurt, Germany	1949	Nominated jointly the only time by Ernest H. Huntress (1899–1970) from Massachusetts Institute of Technology
	Domingo Giribaldo	January 25, 1860; Pando, Uruguay	July 9, 1950; Montevideo, Uruguay	1949	First Latin American nominated for the Nobel Prize in Chemistry.
	David Keilin	March 21, 1887; Moscow, Russia	February 27, 1963; Cambridge, England	1949, 1950, 1954, 1955, 1960	Nominated for Nobel Prize in Physiology or Medicine too
	Karl August Folkers	September 1, 1906; Decatur, Illinois, United States	December 7, 1997; New London, New Hampshire, United States	1949, 1954, 1958, 1961, 1962	Nominated for Nobel Prize in Physiology or Medicine too
	Walter Reppe	July 29, 1892; Eisenach, Germany	July 26, 1969; Heidelberg, Germany	1949, 1950, 1951, 1952, 1953, 1954, 1955, 1956, 1957, 1958, 1959, 1960, 1961, 1962, 1966	
	William Cumming Rose	April 4, 1887; Greenville, South Carolina, United States	September 25, 1985; Urbana, Illinois, United States	1949, 1950, 1957, 1959, 1962, 1966	Nominated for Nobel Prize in Physiology or Medicine too
	Michael Heidelberger	April 29, 1888; New York City, United States	June 25, 1991; New York City, United States	1949, 1953, 1962, 1968	Nominated for Nobel Prize in Physiology or Medicine too
	Ralph Walter Graystone Wyckoff	August 9, 1897; Geneva, New York, United States	November 3, 1994; Tucson, Arizona, United States	1949, 1952, 1973	Nominated for Nobel Prize in Physiology or Medicine too

=== 1950–1959 ===
Picture	Name	Born	Died	Years nominated	Notes
1950
	Archer John Porter Martin	March 1, 1910; London, England	July 28, 2002; Llangarron, England	1950, 1951, 1952, 1973	Shared the 1952 Nobel Prize in Chemistry (Note: “for their invention of partition chromatography”) and nominated for the Nobel Prize in Physiology or Medicine too
	Richard Laurence Millington Synge	October 28, 1914; Liverpool, England	August 18, 1994; Norwich, England	1950, 1951, 1952	Shared the 1952 Nobel Prize in Chemistry and nominated for the Nobel Prize in Physiology or Medicine too
	Melvin Calvin	April 8, 1911; St. Paul, Minnesota, United States	January 8, 1997; Berkeley, California, United States	1950, 1957, 1958, 1959, 1960, 1961	Won the 1961 Nobel Prize in Chemistry (Note: “for his research on the carbon dioxide assimilation in plants”) and nominated for the Nobel Prize in Physiology or Medicine too.
	Dorothy Mary Crowfoot Hodgkin	May 12, 1910; Cairo, Egypt	July 29, 1994; Ilmington, England	1950, 1956, 1957, 1959, 1960, 1961, 1962, 1963, 1964	Won the 1964 Nobel Prize in Chemistry (Note: “for her determinations by X-ray techniques of the structures of important biochemical substances”) and nominated for the Nobel Prize in Physics too.
	Robert S. Mulliken	June 7, 1896; Newburyport, Massachusetts, United States	October 31, 1986; Arlington, Virginia, United States	1950, 1957, 1961, 1963, 1964, 1965, 1966	Won the 1966 Nobel Prize in Chemistry (Note: “for his fundamental work concerning chemical bonds and the electronic structure of molecules by the molecular orbital method”)
	Paul Flory	June 19, 1910; Sterling, Illinois, United States	September 9, 1985; Big Sur, California, United States	1950, 1952, 1956, 1957, 1964, 1965, 1968, 1969, 1970, 1971, 1972, 1973, 1974 (Note: “For his contributions to the understanding of macromolecules; For ... works on the properties of polymers; For ... works on the chemistry of high polymers; For ... experimental and theoretical works on the physical chemistry of macromolecules; For ... works on polymers”)	Won the 1974 Nobel Prize in Chemistry (Note: “for his fundamental achievements, both theoretical and experimental, in the physical chemistry of the macromolecules”)
	Selman Waksman	July 22, 1888; Nova Pryluka, Ukraine	August 16, 1973; Woods Hole, Massachusetts, United States	1950, 1951	Won the 1952 Nobel Prize in Physiology or Medicine.
	Fritz Albert Lipmann	June 12, 1899; Königsberg, Germany	July 24, 1986; Poughkeepsie, New York, United States	1950, 1952, 1975	Won the 1953 Nobel Prize in Physiology or Medicine.
	George Beadle	October 22, 1903; Wahoo, Nebraska, United States	June 9, 1989; Pomona, California, United States	1950, 1954	Shared the 1958 Nobel Prize in Physiology or Medicine with Edw.Tatum
	Thérèse Tréfouël	June 19, 1892; Paris, France	November 9, 1978; Paris, France	1950	Nominated the only time jointly with J.Tréfouël
	Gladwin Albert Hurst Buttle	April 11, 1899; Godstone, England	May 3, 1983; Fulham, England	1950	Nominated the only time jointly with J.Tréfouël
	Arthur Wahl	September 8, 1917; Des Moines, Iowa, United States	March 6, 2006; Santa Fe, New Mexico, United States	1950	. Nominated jointly with Gl.Th.Seaborg and B.B.Cunningham the only time by Otto Hahn
	John Warren Hamaker	October 25, 1917; Montreal, Canada	June 13, 2000; Contra Costa County, California, United States	1950	. Nominated jointly with Gl.Th.Seaborg and B.B.Cunningham the only time by Otto Hahn
	Glenn E. Sheline	1918; Flint, Michigan, United States	March 24, 1989; San Mateo, California, United States	1950	. Nominated jointly with Gl.Th.Seaborg and B.B.Cunningham the only time by Otto Hahn
	Wendell Mitchell Latimer	April 22, 1893; Garnett, Kansas, United States	July 6, 1955; Berkeley, California, United States	1950	. Nominated jointly with Gl.Th.Seaborg and B.B.Cunningham the only time by Otto Hahn
	Louis Werner	June 17, 1921; Idaho, United States	May 20, 2007; San Francisco, United States	1950	. Nominated jointly with Gl.Th.Seaborg and B.B.Cunningham the only time by Otto Hahn
	Isadore Perlman	April 12, 1915; Milwaukee, United States	August 3, 1991; Los Alamitos, California, United States	1950	. Nominated jointly with Gl.Th.Seaborg and B.B.Cunningham the only time by Otto Hahn
	Paul Kirk	May 9, 1902; Colorado Springs, Colorado, United States	June 5, 1970; Alameda, California, United States	1950	. Nominated jointly with Gl.Th.Seaborg and B.B.Cunningham the only time by Otto Hahn
	Raphael Consden	1911; England	November, 1980; Taplow, England	1950, 1951	Nominated jointly with A.J.P.Martin only
	Arthur Hugh Gordon	1916	2003; Camden Town, England	1950, 1951	Nominated jointly with A.J.P.Martin only
	Kaj Ulrik Linderstrøm-Lang	November 29, 1896; Frederiksberg, Denmark	May 25, 1959; Copenhagen, Denmark	1950, 1953, 1956, 1958	
	Edward Joseph Conway	July 3, 1894; Nenagh, Ireland	December 29, 1968; Dublin, Ireland	1950, 1959	Nominated by Thomas S. Wheeler (1899–1962) from University College Dublin only and for Nobel Prize in Physiology or Medicine too
	Hermann Irving Schlesinger	October 11, 1882; Milwaukee, United States	October 3, 1960; Chicago, United States	1950, 1952, 1953, 1954, 1955, 1956, 1957, 1958, 1959, 1960, 1961	
	Burris Bell Cunningham	February 16, 1912; Springer, New Mexico, United States	March 28, 1971; Berkeley, California, United States	1950, 1962, 1963, 1964, 1965, 1966, 1967, 1968, 1969, 1970, 1971	
	Choh Hao Li	April 21, 1913; Guangzhou, China	November 28, 1987; California, United States	1950, 1951, 1953, 1956, 1958, 1959, 1961, 1963, 1967, 1971, 1972	Nominated for Nobel Prize in Physiology or Medicine too First Chinese nominated for the Nobel Prize in Chemistry.
1951
	Willard Libby	December 17, 1908; Parachute, Colorado, United States	September 8, 1980; Los Angeles, United States	1951, 1954, 1955, 1956, 1957, 1958, 1959, 1960	Won the 1960 Nobel Prize in Chemistry (Note: “for his method to use carbon-14 for age determination in archaeology, geology, geophysics, and other branches of science”) and nominated for the Nobel Prize in Physics too.
	Max Perutz	May 19, 1914; Vienna, Austria	February 6, 2002; Cambridge, England	1951, 1959, 1960, 1961, 1962, 1963	Shared the 1962 Nobel Prize in Chemistry with J.Kendrew (Note: “for their studies of the structures of globular proteins”) and nominated for the Nobel Prize in Physics too.
	Yasuhiko Asahina	April 16, 1881; Tokyo, Japan	June 30, 1975; Tokyo, Japan	1951, 1952	
	Axel Edvin Lindh	January 10, 1888; Lund, Sweden	August 14, 1960; Lund, Sweden	1951, 1953	Nominated by J.Stark only.
	Ian Heilbron	November 6, 1886; Glasgow, Scotland	September 14, 1959; London, England	1951, 1953	
	Rudolph Peters	April 13, 1889; Kensington, England	January 29, 1982; Cambridge, England	1951, 1969	Nominated for Nobel Prize in Physiology or Medicine too
1952
	Frederick Sanger	August 13, 1918; Rendcomb, England	November 19, 2013; Cambridge, England	1952, 1953, 1954, 1955, 1956, 1957, 1958, 1974, (Note: “For his works on the structures of RNA and DNA”) 1975	Sanger twice won the 1958 (Note: “for his work on the structure of proteins, especially that of insulin”) and 1980 (jointly with W.Gilbert (Note: “for their contributions concerning the determination of base sequences in nucleic acids”) and P.Berg) Nobel Prizes in Chemistry and nominated for the Nobel Prize in Physiology or Medicine too.
	Frits Zernike	July 16, 1888; Amsterdam, Netherlands	March 10, 1966; Amersfoort, Netherlands	1952	Won the 1953 Nobel Prize in Physics.
	Claude Hudson	January 26, 1881; Atlanta, United States	December 27, 1952; Los Angeles, United States	1952	
	Walther Kossel	January 4, 1888; Berlin, Germany	May 22, 1956; Tübingen, Germany	1952	Nominated the only time by M.von Laue and for the Nobel Prize in Physics too.
	Francis Simon	July 2, 1893; Berlin, Germany	October 31, 1956; Oxford, England	1952, 1954	Nominated by W.Jost only and for the Nobel Prize in Physics too.
	William Hume-Rothery	May 15, 1899; Worcester Park, England	September 27, 1968; Oxford, England	1952, 1957	Nominated by C.St.Smith only and for the Nobel Prize in Physics too.
	Marguerite Perey	October 19, 1909; Villemomble, France	May 13, 1975; Louveciennes, France	1952, 1958, 1961, 1965, 1966	
	Alexander Braunstein	May 26, 1902; Kharkiv, Ukraine	July 1, 1986; Moscow, Russia	1952, 1967, 1969	Nominated for Nobel Prize in Physiology or Medicine too.
	Walter Hieber	December 18, 1895; Stuttgart, Germany	November 29, 1976; Munich, Germany	1952, 1956, 1965, 1966, 1968, 1969	
	Lyman Craig	June 12, 1906; Palmyra Township, Warren County, Iowa, United States	July 7, 1974; Iowa, United States	1952, 1953, 1954, 1955, 1956, 1957, 1958, 1959, 1960, 1965, 1969, 1971	Nominated for Nobel Prize in Physiology or Medicine too
	Erich Müller (probably Erwin Wilhelm Müller)	June 13, 1911 ? Berlin, Germany ?	May 17, 1977 ? Washington, D.C., United States ?	1952, 1967, 1969, 1971, 1972, 1974, (Note: "For the invention of the field ion microscope") 1975	Nominated for Nobel Prize in Physics too.
1953
	Emilio Segrè	January 30, 1905; Tivoli, Lazio, Italy	April 22, 1989; Lafayette, California, United States	1953, 1954, 1955, 1956, 1957, 1958	Shared the 1959 Nobel Prize in Physics with O.Chamberlain.
	Øjvind Winge	May 19, 1886; Aarhus, Denmark	April 5, 1964; Copenhagen, Denmark	1953	Nominated the only time by R.Fisher.
	Izaak Maurits Kolthoff	February 11, 1894; Almelo, Netherlands	March 4, 1993; St. Paul, Minnesota, United States	1953, 1963, 1970, 1972, 1975	
1954
	Edward Tatum	December 14, 1909; Boulder, Colorado, United States	November 5, 1975; New York City, United States	1954	Shared the 1958 Nobel Prize in Physiology or Medicine with G.Beadle.
	Karl Ziegler	November 26, 1898; Helsa, Germany	August 12, 1973; Mülheim, Germany	1954, 1956, 1957, 1958, 1959, 1960, 1961, 1962, 1963	Shared the 1963 Nobel Prize in Chemistry (Note: “for their discoveries in the field of the chemistry and technology of high polymers”)
1955					Shared the 1963 Nobel Prize in Chemistry
	Giulio Natta	February 26, 1903; Imperia, Italy	May 2, 1979; Bergamo, Italy	1955, 1957, 1958, 1959, 1960, 1961, 1962, 1963	Shared the 1963 Nobel Prize in Chemistry
	George Porter	December 6, 1920; Stainforth, South Yorkshire, England	August 31, 2002; Canterbury, England	1955, 1956, 1961, 1964, 1965, 1966, 1967	Shared the 1967 Nobel Prize in Chemistry with M.Eigen and R.G.Wr.Norrish (Note: “for their studies of extremely fast chemical reactions, effected by disturbing the equilibrium by means of very short pulses of energy”)
	Lars Onsager	November 27, 1903; Kristiania, Norway	October 6, 1976; Coral Gables, Florida, United States	1955, 1956, 1957, 1958, 1960, 1962, 1964, 1965, 1966, 1967, 1968	Won the 1968 Nobel Prize in Chemistry (Note: “for the discovery of the reciprocal relations bearing his name, which are fundamental for the thermodynamics of irreversible processes”) and nominated for the Nobel Prize in Physics too.
	Josef Mattauch	November 21, 1895; Ostrava, Czech Republic	August 10, 1976; Klosterneuburg, Austria	1955, 1959	Nominated for the Nobel Prize in Physics too
	Max Volmer	May 3, 1885; Hilden, Germany	June 3, 1965; Potsdam, Germany	1955, 1956, 1959, 1960, 1964, 1965	
	Fritz Feigl	May 15, 1891; Vienna, Austria	January 23, 1971; Rio de Janeiro, Brazil	1955, 1957, 1962, 1963, 1966, 1967, 1969, 1972	
	Félix Trombe	March 19, 1906; Nogent-sur-Marne, France	March 26, 1985; Ganties, France	1955, 1961, 1973	
	Louis Fieser	April 7, 1899; Columbus, Ohio, United States	July 25, 1977; Belmont, Massachusetts, United States	1955, 1974 (Note: "For his works on polycyclic systems and more")	Nominated for Nobel Prize in Physiology or Medicine too
	John Clarke Slater	December 22, 1900; Oak Park, Illinois, United States	July 25, 1976; Sanibel Island, Florida, United States	1955, 1964, 1968, 1969, 1970, 1971, 1972, 1973, 1974 (Note: "For ... contributions to the development of theoretical chemistry")	Nominated for the Nobel Prize in Physics too.
	Martin David Kamen	August 27, 1913; Toronto, Canada	August 31, 2002; Montecito, California, United States	1955, 1962, 1963, 1964, 1968, 1969, 1970, 1971, 1972, 1973, 1975	
1956
	Severo Ochoa de Albornoz	September 24, 1905; Luarca, Spain	November 1, 1993; Madrid, Spain	1956, 1957, 1958, 1959	Shared the 1959 Nobel Prize in Physiology or Medicine with A.Kornberg.
	Georges Lemaître	July 17, 1894; Charleroi, Belgium	June 20, 1966; Leuven, Belgium	1956	Nominated the only time by Don Merlin Lee Yost (1893–1977) from the California Institute of Technology and for the Nobel Prize in Physics too. Lemaître is the only priest nominated for the Nobel Prize in Chemistry.
	Ernest Gale	July 15, 1914; Luton, England	March 7, 2005; Cambridge, England	1956	Nominated jointly the only time by J.H.Northrop
	Joan P. Folkes	1927; Staffordshire, England	(aged 99)	1956	Nominated jointly the only time by J.H.Northrop
	Boris Arbuzov	November 4, 1903; Pulawy, Poland	November 6, 1991; Kazan, Russia	1956	Nominated jointly with Al.Arbuzov the only time by M.M.Dubinin.
	Aleksandr Arbuzov	October 12, 1877; Kazan, Russia	January 22, 1968; Kazan, Russia	1956, 1957, 1961, 1962, 1967, 1968	
	Heinz Fraenkel-Conrat	July 29, 1910; Wrocław, Poland	April 10, 1999; Oakland, California, United States	1956, 1960, 1961, 1962, 1963	
	Friedrich Emil Brauns	1890	1982	1956	Nominated jointly with K.Freudenberg and Er.Hägglund the only time by Joseph Risi (1899–1993) from Université Laval.
	Karl Freudenberg	January 29, 1886; Weinheim, Germany	April 3, 1983; Weinheim, Germany	1956, 1957, 1958, 1960, 1961, 1965, 1966, 1967, 1968, 1969, 1970, 1973, 1974, (Note: “For their works in lignin chemistry”) 1975	
	Jannik Bjerrum	April 5, 1909; Copenhagen, Denmark	August 29, 1992; Copenhagen, Denmark	1956, 1958, 1960, 1961, 1963, 1964, 1965, 1967, 1975	
1957
	Oswald Avery	October 21, 1877; Halifax, Nova Scotia, Canada	February 20, 1955; Nashville, Tennessee, United States	1957	Nominated posthumously and for Nobel Prize in Physiology or Medicine too
	Colin Munro MacLeod	January 28, 1909; Port Hastings, Canada	February 11, 1972; London, England	1957	Nominated jointly with Osw.Avery the only time by J.H.Northrop
	Maclyn McCarty	June 9, 1911; South Bend, Indiana, United States	January 2, 2005; New York City, United States	1957	Nominated jointly with Osw.Avery the only time by J.H.Northrop
	Marietta Blau	April 29, 1894; Vienna, Austria	January 27, 1970; Vienna, Austria	1957	Nominated the only time by Erw.Schrödinger and for the Nobel Prize in Physics too.
	Paul Henri Charpentier	November 11, 1866; Nancy, France	July 20, 1950; Aix-en-Provence, France	1957	Nominated posthumously the only time by G.Hugel from École nationale supérieure du pétrole et des combustibles liquides.
	Charles DuBois Coryell	February 21, 1912; Los Angeles, United States	January 7, 1971; Lexington, Massachusetts, United States	1957	Nominated the only time by M.Perey.
	Maurice-Marie Janot	November 3, 1903; Plombières-les-Bains, France	December 10, 1978; Paris, France	1957	Nominated the only time by G.Cauquil.
	Aleksandr Volodymyrovych Palladin	September 10, 1885; Moscow, Russia	December 6, 1972; Kiev, Ukraine	1957	Nominated the only time by Al.Oparin.
	Georg Stadnikov	January 17, 1880; Vyazovok, Ukraine	February 18, 1973; Russia	1957	Nominated the only time by W.Świętosławski.
	Eric Rideal	April 11, 1890; London, England	September 25, 1974; London, England	1957	Nominated the only time by R.Barrer.
	Bernard Leonard Horecker	October 31, 1914; Chicago, United States	October 10, 2010; Cypress Cove Lodge, United States	1957, 1961, 1971	
	Erich Hückel	August 9, 1896; Berlin, Germany	February 16, 1980; Marburg, Germany	1957, 1965, 1966, 1967, 1968, 1969, 1970, 1971, 1972, 1973	Nominated for the Nobel Prize in Physics too.
	Friedrich Hund	February 4, 1896; Karlsruhe, Germany	March 31, 1997; Karlsruhe, Germany	1957, 1969, 1972, 1975	Nominated jointly with Er.Hückel only and for the Nobel Prize in Physics too.
	Carl Wagner	May 25, 1901; Leipzig, Germany	December 10, 1977; Göttingen, Germany	1957, 1958, 1959, 1963, 1964, 1966, 1968, 1969, 1970, 1973, 1974, (Note: “For his works in solid-state chemistry and on reactions between gases and metals”) 1975	Nominated for the Nobel Prize in Physics too.
1958
	Luis Federico Leloir	September 9, 1906; Paris, France	December 2, 1987; Buenos Aires, Argentina	1958, 1961, 1962, 1963, 1964, 1965, 1966, 1967, 1968, 1969, 1970	Won the 1970 Nobel Prize in Chemistry. (Note: “for his discovery of sugar nucleotides and their role in the biosynthesis of carbohydrates”)
	Gerhard Herzberg	December 25, 1904; Hamburg, Germany	March 3, 1999; Ottawa, Canada	1958, 1960, 1961, 1963, 1965, 1966, 1969, 1970, 1971	Won the 1971 Nobel Prize in Chemistry. (Note: “for his contributions to the knowledge of electronic structure and geometry of molecules, particularly free radicals”)
	Vladimir Prelog	July 23, 1906; Sarajevo, Bosnia and Herzegovina	January 7, 1998; Zurich, Switzerland	1958, 1959, 1964, 1965, 1966, 1967, 1968, 1969, 1970, 1971, 1972, 1973, 1974, (Note: “For his works in organic stereochemistry”) 1975	Shared the 1975 Nobel Prize in Chemistry (Note: “for his research into the stereochemistry of organic molecules and reactions”) with John Warcup Cornforth Jr.
	Georg Wittig	June 16, 1897; Berlin, Germany	August 26, 1987; Heidelberg, Germany	1958, 1960, 1961, 1963, 1964, 1965, 1966, 1967, 1968, 1969, 1970, 1971, 1972, 1973, 1974, (Note: “For his contributions to synthetic organic chemistry; For his works on reaction mechanisms; For ... contribution to the knowledge of organic boron or phosphorus compounds”) 1975	Shared the 1979 Nobel Prize in Chemistry with H.Ch.Brown (Note: “for their development of the use of boron- and phosphorus-containing compounds, respectively, into important reagents in organic synthesis”)
	Maria Goeppert Mayer	June 28, 1906; Kattowitz, Germany	February 20, 1972; San Diego, California, Germany	1958	Shared the 1963 Nobel Prize in Physics
	Johannes Hans Daniel Jensen	June 25, 1907; Hamburg, Germany	February 11, 1973; Heidelberg, Germany	1958	Shared the 1963 Nobel Prize in Physics
	Bogdan Kamieński	March 14, 1897; Oswiecim, Poland	August 9, 1973; Kraków, Poland	1958	Nominated the only time by F.Polak.
	Max Mousseron	May 30, 1902; Sorgues, France	March 1, 1988; Montpellier, France	1958	Nominated the only time by Adrien Perret Gentil (1901–1962) from the University of Neuchâtel.
	Yoshiyuki Toyama	September 6, 1896; Tokyo, Japan	February 12, 1980; Tokyo, Japan	1958	Nominated the only time by I.Miyagawa from the Nagoya University.
	Jean Brachet	March 19, 1909; Etterbeek, Belgium	August 10, 1988; Braine-l'Alleud, Belgium	1958, 1966	Nominated for Nobel Prize in Physiology or Medicine too.
	Gerold Schwarzenbach	March 15, 1904; Horgen, Switzerland	May 20, 1978; Zurich, Switzerland	1958, 1960, 1963, 1964, 1965, 1968, 1970, 1972, 1973, 1974 (Note: “For his development of the complexometric titration method”)	
	Herman Francis Mark	May 3, 1895; Vienna, Austria	April 6, 1992; Austin, Texas, United States	1958, 1965, 1967, 1968, 1969, 1970, 1971, 1973, 1974 (Note: “For his works on the physical chemistry of high polymers”)	Nominated for Nobel Prize in Physics too.
	Yevgeny Zavoisky	September 28, 1907; Mohyliv-Podil's'kyi, Ukraine	October 9, 1976; Moscow, Russia	1958, 1960, 1971, 1973, 1974 (Note: “For their contributions to EPR spectroscopy”)	Nominated for the Nobel Prize in Physics too.
1959
	John Kendrew	March 24, 1917; Oxford, England	August 23, 1997; Cambridge, England	1959, 1961, 1962, 1963	Shared the 1962 Nobel Prize in Chemistry with M.Perutz and nominated for the Nobel Prize in Physics too
	Arthur Kornberg	March 3, 1918; New York City, United States	October 26, 2007; Palo Alto, United States	1959	Shared the 1959 Nobel Prize in Physiology or Medicine with S.Ochoa.
	Feodor Lynen	April 6, 1911; Munich, Germany	August 6, 1979; Munich, Germany	1959, 1960, 1961, 1962, 1963, 1964, 1965	Shared the 1964 Nobel Prize in Physiology or Medicine with K.Bloch.
	Francis Owen Rice	May 20, 1890; Liverpool, England	March 15, 1989; Indiana, United States	1959	Nominated the only time by Charles Alexander McDowell (1918–2001) from the University of British Columbia.
	Günter Scheibe	November 24, 1893; Munich, Germany	May 31, 1980; Stuttgart, Germany	1959	Nominated the only time by Otto Neunhoeffer.
	Frederick Rossini	July 18, 1899; Monongahela, Pennsylvania, United States	October 12, 1990; Juno Beach, Florida, United States	1959	Nominated jointly the only time by Edouard Jean-Pierre Calvet (1895–1966) from the Aix-Marseille University
	Jean Marcel Albert Chedin	August 29, 1908 Bourges, France	October 6, 1990 Paris, France	1959	Nominated jointly the only time by Edouard Jean-Pierre Calvet (1895–1966) from the Aix-Marseille University
	Bror Alexander Ludvig Holmberg	July 30, 1881; Blekinge, Sweden	September 7, 1966; Stockholm, Sweden	1959	Nominated jointly with W.Kuhn and H.Meerwein the only time by Karl Freudenberg.
	Egon Wiberg	June 3, 1901; Güstrow, Germany	November 24, 1976; Munich, Germany	1959, 1965	
	William Gardner Pfann	October 27, 1917; Brooklyn, United States	October 22, 1982; New York, United States	1959, 1960, 1965, 1966, 1968	
	David Ezra Green	August 5, 1910; New York City, United States	July 8, 1983; Madison, Wisconsin, United States	1959, 1973	
	Michael Polanyi	March 11, 1891; Budapest, Hungary	February 22, 1976; Northampton, England	1959, 1960, 1967, 1970, (Note: “Nominations 21161, 22053, 22160, 22161, 22162 and 22225 to J.Polanyi & others are hidden at the Nomination Archive site according to §8 of the statutes governing the Nobel archives of the Royal Swedish Academy of Sciences”) 1973	Nominated for the Nobel Prize in Physics too.
	Walter Hans Schottky	July 23, 1886; Zurich, Switzerland	March 4, 1976; Pretzfeld, Germany	1959, 1966, 1969, 1974, (Note: “For his statistical and thermodynamic works on ion crystals and semiconductors”) 1975	Nominated for the Nobel Prize in Physics too.

=== 1960–1969 ===
Picture	Name	Born	Died	Years Nominated	Notes
1960
	Derek Barton	September 8, 1918; Gravesend, England	March 16, 1998; College Station, Texas, United States	1960, 1961, 1962, 1963, 1964, 1965, 1966, 1967, 1968, 1969	Shared the 1969 Nobel Prize in Chemistry (Note: “for their contributions to the development of the concept of conformation and its application in chemistry”)
	Odd Hassel	May 17, 1897; Oslo, Norway	May 11, 1981; Oslo, Norway	1960, 1963, 1965, 1966, 1967, 1968, 1969	Shared the 1969 Nobel Prize in Chemistry
	Ilya Prigogine	January 25, 1917; Moscow, Russia	May 28, 2003; Brussels, Belgium	1960, 1966, 1973, 1974, (Note: “For his works on linear and non-linear irreversible thermodynamics; For ... works in statistical mechanics and thermodynamics”) 1975	Won the 1977 Nobel Prize in Chemistry (Note: “for his contributions to non-equilibrium thermodynamics, particularly the theory of dissipative structures”) and nominated for the Nobel Prize in Physics too.
	James Watson	April 6, 1928; Chicago, United States	November 6, 2025; East Northport, New York, United States	1960, 1962	Shared the 1962 Nobel Prize in Physiology or Medicine and nominated for the Nobel Prize in Physics too
	Francis Crick	June 8, 1916; Weston Favell, England	July 28, 2004; San Diego, United States	1960, 1962	Shared the 1962 Nobel Prize in Physiology or Medicine and nominated for the Nobel Prize in Physics too
	Maurice Wilkins	December 15, 1916; Pongaroa, New Zealand	October 5, 2004; London, England	1960, 1962	Shared the 1962 Nobel Prize in Physiology or Medicine and nominated for the Nobel Prize in Physics too
	Alfred Hershey	December 4, 1908; Owosso, Michigan, United States	May 22, 1997; Syosset, New York, United States	1960, 1969	Shared the 1969 Nobel Prize in Physiology or Medicine with M.Delbrück and S.Luria.
	Wilhelm Gerard Burgers	August 16, 1897; Arnhem, Netherlands	September 24, 1988; Amsterdam, Netherlands	1960	Nominated the only time by Ant.El. (Toos) Korvezee.
	Martin Deutsch	January 29, 1917; Vienna, Austria	August 16, 2002; Cambridge, Massachusetts, United States	1960	Nominated for the Nobel Prize in Physics too.
	Roger John Williams	August 14, 1893; Ooty, India	February 20, 1988; Austin, Texas, United States	1960	
	Andrew Benson	September 24, 1917; Modesto, California, United States	January 16, 2015; La Jolla, United States	1960	Only nominated with M.Calvin and for Nobel Prize in Physiology or Medicine too.
	Howard Cary	May 3, 1908; Los Angeles, United States	December 20, 1991; Orange, California, United States	1960	Nominated jointly the only time by Wouter (Wout) Berends (1914–1990) from the Delft University of Technology
	Arnold Orville Beckman	April 10, 1900; Cullom, Illinois, United States	May 18, 2004; La Jolla, United States	1960	Nominated jointly the only time by Wouter (Wout) Berends (1914–1990) from the Delft University of Technology
	Jo Engl	August 6, 1893; Munich, Germany	April 8, 1942; New York City, United States	1960	Nominated jointly (Engl&Massolle - posthumously) the only time by Albert Narath (1900–1974) from Technische Universität Berlin
	Joseph Massolle	March 24, 1889; Bielefeld, Germany	April 2, 1957; Berlin, Germany	1960	Nominated jointly (Engl&Massolle - posthumously) the only time by Albert Narath (1900–1974) from Technische Universität Berlin
	Hans Vogt	September 25, 1890; Rehau, Germany	December 4, 1979; Obernzell, Germany	1960	Nominated jointly (Engl&Massolle - posthumously) the only time by Albert Narath (1900–1974) from Technische Universität Berlin
	Martha Cowles Chase	November 30, 1927; Cleveland, Ohio, United States	August 8, 2003; Lorain, Ohio, United States	1960	Nominated jointly with A.Hershey, A.Gierer, H.Fraenkel-Conrat and G.Schramm the only time by J.H.Northrop.
	Alfred Gierer	April 15, 1929; Berlin, Germany	(aged 97)	1960, 1962	Nominated by J.H.Northrop only.
	John G. Aston	1903; United States	August 6, 1990; State College, Pennsylvania, United States	1960, 1966	
	Gerhard Schramm	June 27, 1910; Kanagawa, Japan	February 3, 1969; Tübingen, Germany	1960, 1963, 1964, 1965, 1966, 1967, 1968	
	Manfred Eigen	May 9, 1927; Bochum, Germany	February 6, 2019; Göttingen, Germany	1960, 1962, 1963, 1964, 1965, 1966, 1967	Shared the 1967 Nobel Prize in Chemistry jointly with G.Porter
1961					Shared the 1967 Nobel Prize in Chemistry jointly with G.Porter
	Ronald George Wreyford Norrish	November 9, 1897; Cambridge, England	June 7, 1978; Cambridge, England	1961, 1964, 1965, 1966, 1967	Shared the 1967 Nobel Prize in Chemistry jointly with G.Porter
	Konrad Emil Bloch	January 21, 1912; Nysa, Poland	October 15, 2000; Burlington, Massachusetts, United States	1961, 1962, 1963, 1964	Shared the 1964 Nobel Prize in Physiology or Medicine with F.Lynen.
	Torbjörn Caspersson	October 15, 1910; Motala, Sweden	December 7, 1997; Stockholm, Sweden	1961	Nominated for Nobel Prize in Physiology or Medicine too
	Pierre Van Rysselberghe	May 18, 1905; Brussels, Belgium	1977; United States	1961	Nominated the only time by Giuseppe Bianchi (1919–1996) from University of Milan.
	Robert Corey	August 19, 1897; Springfield (Massachusetts), United States	April 23, 1971; Pasadena, California, United States	1961, 1962	Nominated for Nobel Prize in Physiology or Medicine too.
	Bo Lars Gunnar Sillén	July 11, 1916; Stockholm, Sweden	July 23, 1970; Stockholm, Sweden	1961, 1964, 1965	
	Georges Chaudron	April 29, 1891; Fontenay-sous-Bois, France	March 4, 1976; Paris, France	1961, 1963, 1964, 1965, 1968	
	Leslie Orgel	January 12, 1927; London, England	October 27, 2007; San Diego, United States	1961, 1970, 1973	
	Daniel Israel Arnon	November 14, 1910; Warsaw, Poland	December 20, 1994; Berkeley, California, United States	1961, 1962, 1965, 1966, 1967, 1968, 1969, 1970, 1971, 1972, 1973, 1974 (Note: "For his photosynthetic works")	
	Harry George Drickamer	November 19, 1918; Cleveland, Ohio, United States	May 6, 2002; Urbana, Illinois, United States	1961, 1965, 1966, 1967, 1968, 1969, 1970, 1971, 1972, 1974 (Note: "For his studies on the properties of matter at very high pressures")	
	Johannes Martin Bijvoet	January 23, 1982; Amsterdam, Netherlands	March 4, 1980; Winterswijk, Netherlands	1961, 1964, 1966, 1967, 1968, 1969, 1970, 1971, 1972, 1973, 1974, (Note: "For developing methods for determining the absolute configuration of molecules") 1975	
	Britton Chance	July 24, 1913; Wilkes-Barre, Pennsylvania, United States	November 16, 2010; Philadelphia, United States	1961, 1964, 1965, 1966, 1971, 1972, 1973, 1974, (Note: "For his investigations of the mechanism of enzyme reactions") 1975	
	Efraim Racker	June 28, 1913; Nowy Sacz, Poland	September 9, 1991; Syracuse, New York, United States	1961, 1973, 1975	
1962
	Ernst Otto Fischer	November 10, 1918; Munich, Germany	July 23, 2007; Munich, Germany	1962, 1967, 1968, 1969, 1970, 1973	Shared the 1973 Nobel Prize in Chemistry with G.Wilkinson. (Note: “for their pioneering work, performed independently, on the chemistry of the organometallic, so called sandwich compounds”)
	Louis Néel	November 22, 1904; Lyon, France	November 17, 2000; Brive-la-Gaillarde, France	1962, 1964	Won the 1970 Nobel Prize in Physics.
	Nikolay Vasilyevich Belov	December 14, 1891; Janow Lubelski, Poland	March 6, 1982; Moscow, Russia	1962	Nominated for the Nobel Prize in Physics too.
	Tadeusz Urbanski	October 26, 1901; Krasnodar, Russia	May 29, 1985; Warsaw, Poland	1962	Nominated the only time by F.Polak.
	Karl-Wolfgang Mundry	March 16, 1927; Hildesheim, Germany	May 6, 2009; Stuttgart, Germany	1962	Nominated jointly with A.Gierer the only time by J.H.Northrop.
	Clemens Josef Schöpf	August 12, 1899; Gersfeld, Germany	December 17, 1970; Darmstadt, Germany	1962	
	Alexander Pavlovich Vinogradov	August 21, 1895; Tutayev, Russia	November 16, 1975; Moscow, Russia	1962, 1964, 1965	
	Sanʼichirō Mizushima	March 21, 1899; Tokyo, Japan	August 3, 1983; Tokyo, Japan	1962, 1964, 1967, 1968, 1970, 1971	
	Peter Pauson	July 30, 1925; Bamberg, Germany	December 10, 2013; Glasgow, Scotland	1962, 1971	
	Maurice Stacey	April 8, 1907; Shropshire, England	October 9, 1994; Birmingham, England	1962, 1972	
	Carl Djerassi	October 29, 1923; Vienna, Austria	January 30, 2015; San Francisco, United States	1962, 1964, 1965, 1966, 1968, 1969, 1970, 1971, 1972, 1973, 1974, (Note: “For his works on optical rotatory dispersion, mass spectrometry, and contraception”) 1975	
	Louis Plack Hammett	April 7, 1894; Wilmington, Delaware, United States	February 9, 1987; Medford, New Jersey, United States	1962, 1963, 1964, 1965, 1967, 1968, 1969, 1970, 1971, 1973, 1975	
1963
	Herbert Charles Brown	May 22, 1912; London, England	December 19, 2004; Lafayette, Indiana, United States	1963, 1964, 1966, 1967, 1968, 1969, 1971, 1972, 1973, 1974, (Note: “For his discovery and development of the hydroboration reaction; For ... contribution to the knowledge of organic boron or phosphorus compounds”) 1975	Shared the 1979 Nobel Prize in Chemistry with G.Wittig.
	Har Gobind Khorana	January 9, 1922; Raipur, Pakistan	November 9, 2011; Concord, Massachusetts, United States	1963, 1965, 1966, 1967, 1968, 1974 (Note: “For his synthesis of oligonucleotides and genes”)	Shared the 1968 Nobel Prize in Physiology or Medicine with M.W.Nirenberg and R.W.Holley.
	Wilhelm Ludwig August Geilmann	May 16, 1891; Unterrieden, Germany	May 24, 1967; Mainz, Germany	1963	Nominated the only time by Fr.Strassmann.
	Dionýz Ilkovič	January 18, 1907; Šarišský Štiavnik, Slovakia	August 3, 1980; Bratislava, Slovakia	1963	Nominated the only time by Pandarinath Bhuvanendra Janardhan (b.1921) from the University of Madras.
	Noel Bryan Slater	July 29, 1912; Blackburn, England	January 31, 1973; London, England	1963	Nominated the only time by René Gibert (1908–1968) from École nationale supérieure des industries chimiques.
	Gunnar Blix	September 7, 1894; Lund, Sweden	June 10, 1981; Uppsala, Sweden	1963	Nominated jointly the only time by Serge David (1921–2013) from École nationale supérieure des industries chimiques
	Ernst Klenk	October 14, 1896; Pfalzgrafenweiler, Germany	December 29, 1971; Cologne, Germany	1963	Nominated jointly the only time by Serge David (1921–2013) from École nationale supérieure des industries chimiques
	Stanley Bruckenstein	November 1, 1927; New York City, United States	May 4, 2026	1963	Nominated jointly with Iz.Kolthoff the only time by J.Koskikallio.
	James Baddiley	May 15, 1918; Manchester, England	November 17, 2008; Cambridge, England	1963, 1968	
	Fritz Arndt	July 6, 1885; Hamburg, Germany	December 8, 1969; Hamburg, Germany	1963, 1964, 1965, 1966, 1967, 1968, 1969	Nominated by K.Freudenberg only.
	Alfred Valentin Champagnat	November 2, 1908; Marseille, France	December 13, 1984; Clichy, Hauts-de-Seine, France	1963, 1966, 1970	
	Saul Winstein	October 8, 1912; Montreal, Canada	November 23, 1969; Los Angeles, United States	1963, 1966, 1967, 1968, 1969, 1970	
	John Monteath Robertson	July 24, 1900; Auchterarder, Scotland	September 27, 1989; Inverness, Scotland	1963, 1969, 1971	
	Edgar Bright Wilson Jr.	December 18, 1908; Gallatin, Tennessee, United States	June 12, 1992; Cambridge, Massachusetts, United States	1963, 1969, 1973, 1974 (Note: “For his works on molecular structure and dynamics”)	
	Neil Bartlett	September 15, 1932; Newcastle upon Tyne, England	August 5, 2008; Walnut Creek, California, United States	1963, 1964, 1965, 1966, 1967, 1968, 1969, 1970, 1971, 1972, 1973, 1974, (Note: “For the discovery of noble gas compounds”) 1975	
	Alberte Bucher Pullman	August 26, 1920; Nantes, France	January 7, 2011; Paris, France	1963, 1965, 1968, 1969, 1975	Only nominated jointly
	Bernard Pullman	March 19, 1919; Włocławek, Poland	June 9, 1996; Paris, France	1963, 1965, 1968, 1969, 1975	Only nominated jointly
1964
	Edmund Hirst	July 21, 1898; Lancashire, England	October 29, 1975; Edinburgh, Scotland	1934, 1964	
	Émile-Florent Terroine	January 21, 1882; Paris, France	October 24, 1974; Paris, France	1964	Nominated the only time by Paul V. Creach from the University of Bordeaux.
	Paul Zamecnik	November 22, 1912; Cleveland, Ohio, United States	October 27, 2009; Boston, United States	1964	Nominated the only time by V.Koningsberger.
	Kazuo Yamafuji (山藤 一雄 ヤマフジ カズオ)	1906	1987	1964	
	Arthur Holmes	January 14, 1890; Hebburn, England	September 20, 1965; London, England	1964, 1965	Nominated jointly with Al.P.Vinogradov by N.N.Semenov only.
	Georg-Maria Schwab	February 3, 1899; Berlin, Germany	December 23, 1984; Munich, Germany	1964, 1969	
	Bernd Theodor Matthias	June 8, 1918; Frankfurt, Germany	October 27, 1980; La Jolla, United States	1964, 1966, 1970	Nominated for the Nobel Prize in Physics too.
	František Šorm	February 28, 1913; Prague, Czech Republic	November 18, 1980; Prague, Czech Republic	1964, 1967, 1970, 1971, 1972, 1973	
	Charles Coulson	December 13, 1910; Dudley, England	January 7, 1974; Oxford, England	1964, 1972, 1973	
	Alexander Oparin	March 2, 1894; Uglich, Russia	April 21, 1980; Moscow, Russia	1964, 1969, 1974 (Note: “For his theory on the origin of life; For ... contributions to the knowledge of the molecular origin and development of life on earth”)	
	John Gunnar Malm	June 24, 1921; Chicago, United States	May 11, 1999; Naperville, Illinois, United States	1964, 1965, 1966	Only nominated jointly
	Howard H. Claassen	1918; Hillsboro, Kansas, United States	December 27, 2010; Tacoma, Washington, United States	1964, 1965, 1966	Only nominated jointly
	Henry H. Selig	1927; Frankfurt, Germany	October 21, 2014	1964, 1965, 1966	Only nominated jointly
	Efraim Katchalski-Katzir	May 16, 1916; Kiev, Ukraine	May 30, 2009; Rehovot, Israel	1964, 1966, 1967, 1968, 1969, 1970, 1971, 1972, 1973, 1974, (Note: “For his works on soluble polypeptides as model substances for proteins; For his works on polypeptides; For their works on the properties of polymers; For their works on polymers”) 1975	4th President of the Israel (1973 – 1978).
	Gopalasamudram Narayana Ramachandran	October 8, 1922; Ernakulam, India	April 7, 2001; Chennai, India	1964, 1973, 1975	
1965
	John Warcup Cornforth Jr.	September 7, 1917; Sydney, Australia	December 8, 2013; Sussex, England	1965, 1966, 1967, 1968, 1969, 1970, 1971, 1972, 1973, 1974, (Note: “For his studies on the stereochemistry of enzymatic reactions, especially concerning the biosynthesis of steroids; For his works on the biogenesis of natural products; For ... work on the biosynthesis of squalene and cholesterol”) 1975	Shared the 1975 Nobel Prize in Chemistry (Note: “for his work on the stereochemistry of enzyme-catalyzed reactions”) with Vl.Prelog
	George Joseph Popják	May 5, 1914; Kiskundorozsma, Hungary	December 30, 1998; Westwood, Los Angeles, United States	1965, 1966, 1967, 1968, 1969, 1970, 1971, 1972, 1973, 1974 (Note: “For ... work on the biosynthesis of squalene and cholesterol”)	Nominated jointly with J.W.Cornforth Jr. only.
	Jacques Monod	February 9, 1910; Paris, France	May 31, 1976; Cannes, France	1965	Shared the 1965 Nobel Prize in Physiology or Medicine with A.Lwoff
	J Jacob	June 17, 1920; Nancy, France	April 19, 2013; Paris, France	1965	Shared the 1965 Nobel Prize in Physiology or Medicine with A.Lwoff
	Salomon S. Cohen (prob. Seymour Stanley Cohen)	April 30, 1917 Brooklyn, USA	December 30, 2018	1965	Nominated for Nobel Prize in Physiology or Medicine too.
	Oganes K. Davtyan	April 15, 1911; Akhuryan, Armenia	December 28, 1990; Yerevan, Armenia	1965	Nominated the only time by W.Tomassi.
	Ulick Richardson Evans	March 31, 1889; London, England	April 3, 1980; Cambridge, England	1965	Nominated the only time by Karl Gustaf (Gösta) Wranglén (b.1923) from the KTH Royal Institute of Technology.
	Geoffrey Ingram Taylor	March 7, 1886; London, England	June 27, 1975; Cambridge, England	1965	Nominated for the Nobel Prize in Physics too.
	Henrik Gunnar Lundegårdh	October 23, 1888; Stockholm, Sweden	November 19, 1969; Norrtälje, Sweden	1965	Nominated jointly with D.I.Arnon the only time by M.G.Stålfelt.
	Leonard (Len) E. Mortenson	1928; Melrose, Massachusetts, United States	October 30, 2017; Willow Street, Pennsylvania, United States	1965	Nominated jointly the only time by C.Martius from ETH Zurich
	Raymond Carlyle Valentine	September 20, 1936; Piatt County, Illinois, United States	March 9, 2023; Davis, California, United States	1965	Nominated jointly the only time by C.Martius from ETH Zurich
	James Elliot Carnahan	January 26, 1920; Outagamie County, Wisconsin, United States	March 25, 1996; Stanton, Delaware, United States	1965	Nominated jointly the only time by C.Martius from ETH Zurich
	Jean Roche	January 14, 1901; Sorgues, France	May 24, 1992; Montpellier, France	1965, 1966, 1967	Nominated by C.Heymans only.
	Ivan Stranski	January 2, 1897; Sofia, Bulgaria	June 19, 1979; Sofia, Bulgaria	1965, 1967	Nominated by G.-M.Schwab only.
	Charles Prévost	March 20, 1899; Champlitte, France	July 11, 1983; Paris, France	1965, 1966, 1969, 1970	
	Rudolf Hoppe	October 29, 1922; Wittenberge, Germany	November 24, 2014; Giessen, Germany	1965, 1967, 1970	Nominated jointly with N.Bartlett only.
	Erwin Chargaff	August 11, 1905; Chernivtsi, now Ukraine	June 20, 2002; New York City, United States	1965, 1967, 1971	
	André Guinier	August 1, 1911; Nancy, France	July 3, 2000; Paris, France	1965, 1973	Nominated for the Nobel Prize in Physics too
	Rudolf Criegee	May 23, 1902; Düsseldorf, Germany	November 7, 1975; Karlsruhe, Germany	1965, 1966, 1967, 1968, 1969, 1970, 1971, 1973	
	Alfred Rieche	April 28, 1902; Dortmund, Germany	November 6, 2001; Berlin, Germany	1965, 1966, 1967, 1968, 1969, 1970, 1971, 1973	Nominated jointly with G.Wittig and Rudolf Criegee by K.Freudenberg only.
	Otto Kratky	March 9, 1902; Vienna, Austria	February 11, 1995; Graz, Austria	1965, 1967, 1968, 1969, 1971, 1973, 1974 (Note: “For his application of low-angle X-ray scattering”)	Nominated for the Nobel Prize in Physics too
	Paul Doughty Bartlett	August 14, 1907; Ann Arbor, United States	October 11, 1997; Lexington, Massachusetts, United States	1965, 1974, (Note: “For his works on protein chemistry”) 1975	
	Albert Eschenmoser	August 5, 1925; Erstfeld, Switzerland	July 14, 2023	1965, 1966, 1968, 1969, 1970, 1971, 1972, 1973, 1974, (Note: “For his synthesis of vitamin B12 and the development of new synthesis methods associated with it; For new methods of stereospecific organic synthesis; For ... contributions to synthetic organic chemistry”) 1975	
	Stanley George Mason	March 20, 1914; Montreal, Canada	April 21, 1987; Quebec, Canada	1965, 1975	
	Alan Walsh	December 19, 1916; Hoddlesden, England	August 3, 1998; Melbourne, Australia	1965, 1966, 1967, 1968, 1969, 1971, 1972, 1973. 1975	Nominated for the Nobel Prize in Physics too
	Marshall Warren Nirenberg	April 10, 1927; New York City, United States	January 15, 2010; New York City, United States	1965, 1966, 1967, 1968, 1971	Shared the 1968 Nobel Prize in Physiology or Medicine with H.G.Khorana
1966					Shared the 1968 Nobel Prize in Physiology or Medicine with H.G.Khorana
	Robert William Holley	January 28, 1922; Urbana, Illinois, United States	February 11, 1993; Los Gatos, California, United States	1966, 1967, 1968	Shared the 1968 Nobel Prize in Physiology or Medicine with H.G.Khorana
	Stanford Moore	September 4, 1913; Chicago, United States	August 23, 1982; New York City, United States	1966, 1970, 1971, 1972	Shared the 1972 Nobel Prize in Chemistry (Note: “for their contribution to the understanding of the connection between chemical structure and catalytic activity of the active centre of the ribonuclease molecule”) with Chr.B.Anfinsen Jr. and nominated for the Nobel Prize in Physiology or Medicine too
	William Howard Stein	June 25, 1911; New York City, United States	February 2, 1980; New York City, United States	1966, 1970, 1971, 1972	Shared the 1972 Nobel Prize in Chemistry with Chr.B.Anfinsen Jr. and nominated for the Nobel Prize in Physiology or Medicine too
	Bernard Halpern	November 2, 1904; Tarnoruda, now Ukraine	September 23, 1978; Paris, France	1966	Nominated for Nobel Prize in Physiology or Medicine too
	Kurt Bruno Hannig	May 26, 1920; Liberec, Czech Republic	January 20, 1993	1966	Nominated the only time by R.L.M.Synge.
	James Franklin Hyde	March 11, 1903; Solvay, New York, United States	October 11, 1999; Marco Island, Florida, United States	1966	Nominated the only time by E.G.Rochow.
	Arthur Lüttringhaus	July 6, 1906; Cologne, Germany	May 27, 1992; Freiburg im Breisgau, Germany	1966	Nominated the only time by P.Ad.Thiessen.
	Edwin Theodore Mertz	December 6, 1909; Missoula, Montana, United States	February 1, 1999; Richardson, Texas, United States	1966	Nominated the only time by Gerard R. Pomerat (1901–1980) from the Rockefeller Foundation.
	Laurens Lambertus Marie van Deenen	August 14, 1928; Maastricht, Netherlands	September 4, 1994; Bilthoven, Netherlands	1966 (Note: “Nomination 19435 by L.Saunders has been hidden at the Nomination Archive site”)	(Note: “Data about nomination of Laurens L M van Deenen (id 13330) have been hidden at the Nomination Archive site”) Nominated jointly the only time by Leonard Saunders from UCL School of Pharmacy (Note: “Data of G H de Haas (id 14300) have been hidden at the Nomination Archive site”)
	G. Horrëus de Haas	September 20, 1931; The Hague, Netherlands	November 26, 2006; Utrecht, Netherlands	1966	Nominated jointly the only time by Leonard Saunders from UCL School of Pharmacy
	Charles Louis Marie Claude Vernet	January 12, 1924; Châteauneuf-de-Gadagne, France	March 31, 2015; Avignon, France	1966	Nominated jointly with Alfred V. Champagnat the only time by R.Schultze
	Bernard Maurice Lainé	April 4, 1933; Paris, France	January 13, 2013; Paris, France	1966	Nominated jointly with Alfred V. Champagnat the only time by R.Schultze
	Jean Antoine Filosa	May 29, 1930; Marseille, France	September 16, 2022; La Canourgue, France	1966	Nominated jointly with Alfred V. Champagnat the only time by R.Schultze
	Thiruvengadam Rajendram Seshadri	February 3, 1900; Kulithalai, India	September 27, 1975; New Delhi, India	1966, 1968	
	Kenneth Pitzer	January 6, 1914; Pomona, California, United States	December 26, 1997; Berkeley, California, United States	1966, 1967, 1968, 1969, 1971	
	Richard Barrer	June 16, 1910; Wellington, New Zealand	September 12, 1996; Chislehurst, England	1966, 1973, 1974, (Note: “For the discovery and development of molecular sieves”) 1975	
	Robert Schwyzer	December 8, 1920; Zurich, Switzerland	September 29, 2015; Bülach, Switzerland	1966, 1969, 1970, 1975	Nominated by P.Karrer only.
	Sol Spiegelman	December 14, 1914; Brooklyn, United States	January 20, 1983; New York City, United States	1966, 1970, 1971, 1973, 1974, (Note: “For his development of molecular hybridization techniques; For ... contributions to the knowledge of the molecular origin and development of life on earth”) 1975	
1967
	Geoffrey Wilkinson	July 14, 1921; Todmorden, West Riding of Yorkshire, England	September 26, 1996; London, England	1967, 1968, 1969, 1970, 1973	Shared the 1973 Nobel Prize in Chemistry with Ern.Ot.Fischer.
	Robert Bruce Merrifield	July 15, 1921; Fort Worth, Texas, United States	May 14, 2006; Cresskill, New Jersey, United States	1967, 1968, 1969, 1970, 1971, 1972, 1973, 1974, (Note: “For his methodology for the synthesis of polypeptides and proteins; For ... works on polymers”) 1975	Won the 1984 Nobel Prize in Chemistry (Note: “for his development of methodology for chemical synthesis on a solid matrix”)
	George Wald	November 18, 1906; New York City, United States	April 12, 1997; Cambridge, Massachusetts, United States	1967	Shared the 1967 Nobel Prize in Physiology or Medicine with R.Arth.Granit and H.K.Hartline.
	Max Rudolf "Rudi" Lemberg	October 19, 1896; Breslau, now Poland	April 10, 1975; Wahroonga, New South Wales, Australia	1967	Nominated the only time by Benoit Wurtz from the University of Strasbourg.
	James Joseph Lingane	September 13, 1909; Saint Paul, Minnesota, United States	March 14, 1994; Lexington, Massachusetts, United States	1967	Nominated the only time by Pandarinath Bhuvanendra Janardhan (b.1921) from the University of Madras.
	Richard Alan Morton	September 22, 1899; Liverpool, England	January 21, 1977; Liverpool, England	1967	Nominated the only time by W.Ch.Evans.
	Giorgio Piccardi	October 13, 1895; Florence, Italy	December 22, 1972; Riccione, Italy	1967	Nominated the only time by D.Marotta.
	Hans Eduard Schmid	March 24, 1917; Gränichen, Switzerland	December 19, 1976; Schwerzenbach, Switzerland	1967	Nominated the only time by Em.Cherbuliez.
	Frank Harold Spedding	October 22, 1902; Hamilton, Ontario, Canada	December 15, 1984; Ames, Iowa, United States	1967	
	Ahmed Riad (Reyad) Tourky	March 16, 1902; Tanta, Egypt	January 17, 1971; Cairo, Egypt	1967	Nominated the only time by Abdel Aziz Ali Mousa (1915–1979) from the University of Cairo.
	Ellison Hall Taylor	September 6, 1913; Kalamazoo, Michigan, United States	May 31, 2008; Oak Ridge, Tennessee, United States	1967	Nominated jointly the only time by E.Wigner
	Sheldon Datz	July 21, 1927; New York City, United States	August 15, 2001; Oak Ridge, Tennessee, United States	1967	Nominated jointly the only time by E.Wigner
	Mary Belle Allen	November 11, 1922; Morristown, New Jersey	1973; Fairbanks, Alaska	1967	Nominated jointly with D.I.Arnon the only time by J.H.Northrop
	Frederick Robert Whatley	January 26, 1924; Wilton, Wiltshire, England	November 14, 2020	1967	Nominated jointly with D.I.Arnon the only time by J.H.Northrop
	Stephen Brunauer	February 12, 1903; Budapest, Hungary	July 6, 1986; Potsdam, New York, United States	1967	Nominated jointly with P.H.Emmett the only time by R.I.Razouk from the Ain Shams University, Cairo, Egypt Teller nominated for the Nobel Prize in Physics too.
	Edward Teller	January 15, 1908; Budapest, Hungary	September 9, 2003; Stanford, California, United States	1967	Nominated jointly with P.H.Emmett the only time by R.I.Razouk from the Ain Shams University, Cairo, Egypt Teller nominated for the Nobel Prize in Physics too.
	Paul Hugh Emmett	September 22, 1900; Portland, Oregon, United States	April 22, 1985; Portland, Oregon, United States	1967, 1973	
	Manuel Ballester Boix	June 27, 1919; Barcelona, Catalonia, Spain	April 5, 2005	1967, 1971	
	Esmond Emerson Snell	September 22, 1914; Salt Lake City, Utah, United States	December 9, 2003; Boulder, Colorado, United States	1967, 1969, 1971	
	Frank Albert Cotton	April 9, 1930; Philadelphia, PA, United States	February 20, 2007; College Station, TX, United States	1967, 1970, 1972	
	Jean Lecomte	August 5, 1898	March 28, 1979	1967, 1973	Nominated by Clément Raymond François Courty (b.1902) from the University of Lyon only
1968
	Donald James Cram	April 22, 1919; Chester, Vermont, United States	June 17, 2001; Palm Desert, California, United States	1968, 1969, 1975	Shared the 1987 Nobel Prize in Chemistry with J.-M.Lehn and Ch.J.Pedersen (Note: “for their development and use of molecules with structure-specific interactions of high selectivity”)
	George Andrew Olah	May 22, 1927; Budapest, Hungary	March 8, 2017; Beverly Hills, California, United States	1968, 1969, 1974, (Note: “For his works on carbocation chemistry”) 1975	Won the 1994 Nobel Prize in Chemistry (Note: “for his contribution to carbocation chemistry”)
	Erika Cremer	May 20, 1900; Munich, Germany	September 21, 1996; Innsbruck, Austria	1968	Nominated the only time by Fr.X.M.Th.Patat.
	Kenneth George Denbigh	May 30, 1911; Luton, England	January 23, 2004; London, England	1968	Nominated the only time by Joseph (Jean?) Cathala (1892–1969) from the l’École nationale supérieure des ingénieurs en génie chimique, Toulouse.
	Joseph Oakland Hirschfelder	May 27, 1911; Baltimore, Maryland, United States	March 30, 1990; Madison, Wisconsin, United States	1968	Nominated the only time by Arthur Neville Hambly (1909–1996) from the Australian National University, Canberra.
	Kozyrev, Boris Mikhaylovich	May 4, 1905; Ashgabat, Turkmenistan	October 21, 1979; Kazan, Russia	1968	Nominated the only time by M.Dole.
	Alfred O. C. Nier	May 28, 1911; St. Paul, Minnesota, United States	May 16, 1994; Hennepin County Medical Center, United States	1968	Nominated for the Nobel Prize in Physics too.
	Eiji Ochiai	June 26, 1898; Chiba, Japan	November 4, 1974	1968	Nominated the only time by Shuzo Shibata (b.1924) from the Shizuoka University.
	Eugene George Rochow	October 4, 1909; Newark, New Jersey, United States	March 21, 2002; Fort Myers, Florida, United States	1968	Nominated the only time by H.Schäfer.
	Einar August Stenhagen	April 6, 1911; Söderala, Sweden	December 14, 1973; Mölndal, Sweden	1968	Nominated the only time by Jean Asselineau (1921–2013) from the University of Toulouse.
	Hans Tuppy	July 22, 1924; Vienna, Austria	April 24, 2024	1968	Nominated the only time by F.K.L.Machatschki.
	Aharon Katzir-Katchalsky	September 15, 1914; Łódź, Poland	May 30, 1972; Ben Gurion International Airport, Israel	1968	Nominated jointly with Efr.Katchalski the only time by L.Lorand.
	Brian Edward Cross	October 9, 1923	2014 (?)	1968	Nominated jointly the only time by Kozo Hirota from the Osaka University
	Yusuke Sumiki	February 10, 1901	September 11, 1974	1968	Nominated jointly the only time by Kozo Hirota from the Osaka University
	Teijirō Yabuta	December 16, 1888; Ōtsu, Japan	July 20, 1977; Tokyo, Japan	1968	Nominated jointly the only time by Kozo Hirota from the Osaka University
	Bernard Lewis	1899; London, England	May 23, 1993; Pittsburgh, United States	1968	Nominated jointly with Al.Frumkin the only time by N.N.Semyonov Zeldovich nominated for the Nobel Prize in Physics too
	Yakov Borisovich Zeldovich	March 8, 1914; Minsk, Belarus	December 2, 1987; Moscow, Russia	1968	Nominated jointly with Al.Frumkin the only time by N.N.Semyonov Zeldovich nominated for the Nobel Prize in Physics too
	Léon Velluz	July 31, 1904; Bourg-en-Bresse, France	May 28, 1981; Paris, France	1968	Nominated jointly the only time by P.Bédos from the University of Toulouse
	Maurice Legrand			1968	Nominated jointly the only time by P.Bédos from the University of Toulouse
	Marc Grosjean			1968	Nominated jointly the only time by P.Bédos from the University of Toulouse
	Arie Jan Haagen-Smit	December 22, 1900; Utrecht, Netherlands	March 17, 1977; Pasadena, California, United States	1968, 1970	
	Eugene Patrick Kennedy	September 4, 1919; United States	September 22, 2011; Cambridge, Massachusetts, United States	1968, 1974 (Note: “For his work on the biosynthesis of phospholipids”)	
	Klaus Biemann	November 2, 1926; Innsbruck, Austria	June 2, 2016; Brunswick, Maine, United States	1968, 1969, 1970, 1975	
	Henri Normant	June 25, 1907; Plozévet, France	December 5, 1997; Paris, France	1968, 1969, 1970, 1971, 1972, 1974, (Note: “For his discoveries in organometallic chemistry; For his contributions to synthetic organic chemistry”) 1975	
	Anthony Leonid Turkevich	July 23, 1916; Manhattan, New York, United States	September 7, 2002; Lexington, Virginia, United States	1968, 1975	
	David Warren Turner	July 16, 1927; Leigh-on-Sea, England	(aged 99)	1968, 1971, 1972, 1973, 1974, (Note: “Nominations 19661, 22016, 22185, 22227, 22882, 22935, 24662 and 24692 to David Warren Turner are hidden at the Nomination Archive site according to §8 of the statutes governing the Nobel archives of the Royal Swedish Academy of Sciences”) 1975	Nominated for the Nobel Prize in Physics too (Note: “Data of David Warren Turner (id 14450) are hidden at the Nomination Archive site according to §8 of the statutes governing the Nobel archives of the Royal Swedish Academy of Sciences”)
	Otto Hermann Eduard Westphal	February 1, 1913; Berlin, Germany	September 14, 2004; Montreux, Switzerland	1968, 1972, 1975	
	Ivo Zvara	June 11, 1934; Veliny, Czech Republic	December 27, 2021	1968	Nominated jointly with G.N.Flerov the only time by Russian academician A.W.Nikolajev.
	Georgy Nikolayevich Flerov	March 2, 1913; Rostov-on-Don, Russia	November 19, 1990; Moscow, Russia	1968, 1969, 1972, 1975	Nominated for the Nobel Prize in Physics too.
1969
	Konstantin Antonovich Petrzhak (Pietrzak)	September 4, 1907; Łuków, now Poland	October 10, 1998; Saint Petersburg, Russia	1969	Nominated jointly with G.N.Flerov the only time by I.V.Petrjanov-Sokolov.
	Roald Hoffmann (born Roald Safran)	July 18, 1937; Złoczów, now Ukraine	(aged 89)	1969, 1971, 1972, 1973, 1974 (Note: “Nomination 20925, 22048, 22217, 22218, 22926, 24685, 24798 and 24799 and following ones to R.Hoffmann are hidden at the Nomination Archive site according to §8 of the statutes governing the Nobel archives of the Royal Swedish Academy of Sciences”)	Shared the 1981 Nobel Prize in Chemistry with K.Fukui (Note: “for their theories, developed independently, concerning the course of chemical reactions”) (Note: “Data of R Hoffman (id 15546) are hidden at the Nomination Archive site according to §8 of the statutes governing the Nobel archives of the Royal Swedish Academy of Sciences”)
	Kai Manne Börje Siegbahn	April 20, 1918; Lund, Sweden	July 20, 2007; Ängelholm, Sweden	1969, 1970, 1971, 1972, 1973, 1974, (Note: “For his development and application of electron spectroscopy for the study of chemical structure problems”) 1975	Shared the 1981 Nobel Prize in Physics (Note: “for his contribution to the development of high-resolution electron spectroscopy”) with N.Bloembergen and A.L.Schawlow
	Francis Pettit Bundy	September 1, 1910; Columbus, Ohio, United States	February 23, 2008; Lebanon, Ohio, United States	1969	Nominated the only time by Alfr.R.J.P.Ubbelohde.
	Raymond Jean Calas	April 8, 1914; Montpellier, France	September 28, 1996	1969	Nominated the only time by G.Cauquil.
	Theodor Förster	May 15, 1910; Frankfurt am Main, Germany	May 20, 1974; Stuttgart, Germany	1969	Nominated the only time by G.Porter.
	Charles Lambert Marie Joseph Manneback	March 9, 1894; Etterbeek, Belgium	December 15, 1975; Etterbeek, Belgium	1969	Nominated the only time by J.De Clerck.
	David Nachmansohn	March 17, 1899; Ekaterinoslav, now Ukraine	November 2, 1983; New York City, United States	1969	Nominated for Nobel Prize in Physiology or Medicine too.
	Roberto Piontelli	May 11, 1909; Lodi, Lombardy, Italy	October 15, 1971; Milan, Italy	1969	
	Eugene Rabinowitch	April 27, 1901; Saint Petersburg, Russia	May 15, 1973; Washington, D.C., United States	1969	Nominated the only time by Jan Bartholomeus Thomas (1907–1991) from the Utrecht University.
	Petr Aleksandrovich Rebinder	October 3, 1898; Saint Petersburg, Russia	July 12, 1972; Moscow, Russia	1969	Nominated the only time by László Erdey (1910–1970) from the Hungarian Academy of Sciences.
	Melville Lawrence Wolfrom	April 2, 1900; Bellevue, Ohio, United States	June 20, 1969; Columbus, Ohio, United States	1969	Nominated the only time by Alex (Elion) Rosenthal (1914–2012) from the University of British Columbia.
	Helmut Zahn	June 13, 1916; Erlangen, Germany	November 14, 2004; Aachen, Germany	1969	Nominated the only time by Otto Kratky.
	László Zechmeister	May 14, 1889; Győr, Hungary	February 28, 1972; Pasadena, California, United States	1969	Nominated the only time by Zoltan Csürös (1901–1979) from the Technical University of Budapest.
	Jacques Bénard	December 12, 1912; Blois, France	October 4, 1987; Bourg-la-Reine, France	1969	Jointly nominated the only time by Michel Destriau (1928–2010) from the University of Bordeaux
	Adolphe (Emile Philippe) Van Tiggelen	December 2, 1914; Molenbeek-Saint-Jean, Belgium	November 2, 1969; Leuven, Belgium	1969	Jointly nominated the only time by Michel Destriau (1928–2010) from the University of Bordeaux
	John Machlin Buchanan	September 29, 1917; Winamac, Indiana, United States	June 25, 2007; Burlington, Massachusetts, United States	1969	Nominated jointly with L.F.Leloir the only time by A.B.Pardee.
	Marc Julia	October 23, 1922; Paris, France	June 29, 2010; Paris, France	1969	Nominated jointly with H.C.Brown and C.Djerassi the only time by Gérard Etienne Louis Lamaty (1930–2012) from the University of Montpellier.
	Costin D. Neniţescu	July 15, 1902; Bucharest, Romania	July 28, 1970; Bușteni, Romania	1969	Nominated jointly with R.Criegee the only time by P.D.Bartlett
	Rowland Pettit	February 6, 1927; Port Lincoln, Australia	December 10, 1981; Austin, Texas, United States	1969	Nominated jointly with R.Criegee the only time by P.D.Bartlett
	Albert Kirrmann	June 28, 1900; Strasbourg, France	March 10, 1974	1969	Nominated jointly with Chr.K.Ingold, L.Pl.Hammett and Ch.Prévost the only time by Alb.Bruylants.
	Horace Albert "Nook" Barker	November 29, 1907; Oakland, California, United States	December 24, 2000; Berkeley, California, United States	1969, 1971, 1972	
	Harry Julius Emeléus	June 22, 1903; Poplar, London, England	December 2, 1993; Cambridge, England	1969, 1972	
	Rolf Huisgen	June 13, 1920; Gerolstein, Germany	March 26, 2020; Munich, Germany	1969, 1971, 1973	
	Friedrich Wilhelm Jost	June 15, 1903; Friedberg, Hesse, Germany	September 23, 1988; Göttingen, Germany	1969, 1972, 1973	
	Horst Tobias Witt	March 1, 1922; Bremen, Germany	May 14, 2007; Berlin, Germany	1969, 1972, 1973	
	Pehr Victor Edman	April 14, 1916; Stockholm, Sweden	March 19, 1977; Munich, Germany	1969, 1970, 1971, 1972, 1973, 1974 (Note: “For the development of the ""Edman"" degradation method and the automatic sequenator”)	
	Harden M. McConnell	July 18, 1927; Richmond, Virginia, United States	October 8, 2014	1969, 1970, 1971, 1972, 1973, 1974 (Note: “For his introduction of the spin labeling method and its application to biomolecules and biological structures; For ... contributions to EPR spectroscopy”)	
	Franz Sondheimer	May 17, 1926; Stuttgart, Germany	February 11, 1981; Stanford University, United States	1969, 1974 (Note: “For his investigations in the chemistry of annulenes”)	
	Gilbert Stork	December 31, 1921; Brussels, Belgium	October 21, 2017; United States	1969, 1970, 1971, 1974 (Note: “For ... contributions to synthetic organic chemistry”)	
	Alexander Nikolaevich Nesmeyanov	September 9, 1899; Moscow, Russia	January 17, 1980; Moscow, Russia	1969, 1970, 1972, 1973, 1974, (Note: “For his works in organometallic chemistry”) 1975	
	Jerker Porath	October 23, 1921; Sala, Sweden	January 21, 2016; Lund, Sweden	1969, 1970, 1971, 1973, 1975	
	Egon Peter Gustav Stahl	October 18, 1924; Eberbach (Baden), Germany	September 5, 1986; Eberbach (Baden), Germany	1969, 1972, 1975	

=== 1970– ===
Nominees are published 50 years later so 1976 nominees should be published in 2027.

Picture	Name	Born	Died	Years Nominated	Notes
1970
	Jerome Karle	June 18, 1918; New York City, United States	June 6, 2013; Annandale, Virginia, United States	1970	Shared the 1985 Nobel Prize in Chemistry with H.A.Hauptman (Note: “for their outstanding achievements in the development of direct methods for the determination of crystal structures”) and nominated for the Nobel Prize in Physics too
	John Charles Polanyi	January 23, 1929; Berlin, Germany	(aged 97)	1970, 1971, 1972	Shared the 1986 Nobel Prize in Chemistry with D.R.Herschbach and Yu.T.Lee. (Note: “for their contributions concerning the dynamics of chemical elementary processes”) (Note: “Data of John Polanyi (id 15675) are hidden at the Nomination Archive site according to §8 of the statutes governing the Nobel archives of the Royal Swedish Academy of Sciences”)
	Elias James Corey	July 12, 1928; Methuen, Massachusetts, United States	(aged 98)	1970, 1972, 1973, 1974, (Note: “Nominations 21155, 22103-22107, 22231-22233, 22795-22797, 22912, 22913, 22942 and 24733-24736 to El.J.Corey are hidden at the Nomination Archive site according to §8 of the statutes governing the Nobel archives of the Royal Swedish Academy of Sciences”) 1975	Won the 1990 Nobel Prize in Chemistry (Note: “for his development of the theory and methodology of organic synthesis”) (Note: “Data of El.J.Corey (id 15672) are hidden at the Nomination Archive site according to §8 of the statutes governing the Nobel archives of the Royal Swedish Academy of Sciences”)
	Karl Sune Detlof Bergström	January 10, 1916; Stockholm, Sweden	August 15, 2004; Stockholm, Sweden	1970, 1971, 1972, 1973, 1974, (Note: “For his works on the chemistry of prostaglandins; For his works on the structure and biosynthesis of prostaglandins; For his works on the biosynthesis of phospholipids”) 1975	Shared the 1982 Nobel Prize in Physiology or Medicine with B.I.Samuelsson and J.R.Vane. (Note: “for their discoveries concerning prostaglandins and related biologically active substances”)
	Walter Houser Brattain	February 10, 1902; Xiamen, China	October 13, 1987; Seattle, Washington, USA	1970	Shared the 1956 Nobel Prize in Physics with J.Bardeen and William Shockley.
	Bernhardt Patrick John O’Mara Bockris	January 5, 1923; Johannesburg, South Africa	July 7, 2013; Gainesville, Florida, United States	1970	Jointly nominated with W.H.Brattain the only time by T.M.Salem from the Alexandria University
	Herbert Spencer Harned	December 2, 1888; Camden, New Jersey, United States	July 29, 1969	1970	Jointly nominated with W.H.Brattain the only time by T.M.Salem from the Alexandria University
	J. D. Bernal	May 10, 1901; Nenagh, Ireland	September 15, 1971; London, England	1970	Nominated the only time by Harry Francis West Taylor (1923–2002) from the University of Aberdeen and for the Nobel Prize in Physics too.
	Gaston Charlot	June 11, 1904; Heuilley-sur-Saône, France	April 17, 1994; Paris, France	1970	Nominated the only time by Gabriel Antoine Tridot (1924–1993), Director of École nationale supérieure de chimie de Lille.
	Michel Marcel Delhaye	March 10, 1929; Fresnes-sur-Escaut, France	February 12, 2014; Lille, France	1970	Nominated the only time by Joseph M. Heubel (b. 1920) from the Lille University of Science and Technology.
	Matthew Stanley Meselson	May 24, 1930; Denver, Colorado, United States	(aged 96)	1970 (Note: “Nomination 21107 to M.St.Meselson is hidden at the Nomination Archive site according to §8 of the statutes governing the Nobel archives of the Royal Swedish Academy of Sciences”)	Nominated for the Nobel Peace Prize too (Note: “Data of M.St.Meselson (id 15637) are hidden at the Nomination Archive site according to §8 of the statutes governing the Nobel archives of the Royal Swedish Academy of Sciences”)
	George Scatchard	March 19, 1892; Oneonta, New York, United States	December 10, 1973; Cambridge, Massachusetts, United States	1970	Nominated the only time by Ch.Tanford.
	Hermann Theodor Felix Wieland	June 5, 1913; Munich, Germany	November 24, 1995; Heidelberg, Germany	1970	Nominated the only time by S.Siddiqui.
	Walter Hückel	February 18, 1895; Charlottenburg, Germany	January 4, 1973; Tübingen, Germany	1970	Nominated jointly with Vl.Prelog the only time by Hassan S. El Khadem (1923–2012) from the Michigan Technological University.
	John Wilson ("Jack") Boag	June 20, 1911; Elgin, Moray, Scotland	January 2, 2007	1970	Jointly nominated the only time by R.Braams.
	Edwin James ("Ed") Hart	February 7, 1910; Port Angeles, Washington, United States	March 25, 1995; Port Angeles, Washington, United States	1970	Jointly nominated the only time by R.Braams.
	Robert LeRoy Platzman	August 23, 1918; Minneapolis, United States	July 2, 1973; Chicago, United States	1970	Jointly nominated the only time by R.Braams.
	George Simms Hammond	May 22, 1921; Auburn, Maine, United States	October 5, 2005; Portland, Oregon, United States	1970	Jointly nominated (Terenin - posthumously) with St.M.Claesson the only time by N.M.Emanuel
	Aleksandr Nikolaevich Terenin	May 6, 1896; Kaluga, Russia	January 18, 1967; Moscow, Russia	1970	Jointly nominated (Terenin - posthumously) with St.M.Claesson the only time by N.M.Emanuel
	Vilesov, Feodor Ivanovich	November 12, 1925; Belyukovo, Perm Region, Russia	February 7, 1978; Leningrad, Russia	1970 (Note: “Nomination 21166 is hidden at the Nomination Archive site according to § 8 of the statutes governing the Nobel archives of the Royal Swedish Academy of Sciences”)	(Note: “Data of Feodor Ivanovich Vilesov (id 15684) are hidden at the Nomination Archive site according to § 8 of the statutes governing the Nobel archives of the Royal Swedish Academy of Sciences”)
	Charles Gilbert Overberger	October 12, 1920; Barnesboro, Pennsylvania, United States	March 17, 1997; Ann Arbor, United States	1970	Nominated jointly with K.J.Freudenberg and Al.N.Nesmeyanov the only time by Cr.I.Simionescu.
	Henry Montague (Monty) Frey	February 27, 1929; London, England	May 26, 2026	1970	Jointly nominated the only time by Youssef Iskander from the Alexandria University.
	Jack Sylvester Hine	July 2, 1923; Coronado, California, United States	July 6, 1988; Columbus, Ohio, United States	1970	Jointly nominated the only time by Youssef Iskander from the Alexandria University.
	Wolfgang Kirmse	June 26, 1930; Frankfurt am Main, Germany	October 3, 2025; Bochum, Germany	1970	Jointly nominated the only time by Youssef Iskander from the Alexandria University.
	David 'Davy' Adriaan van Dorp	April 27, 1915; Amsterdam, Netherlands	February 19, 1995; Vlaardingen, Netherlands	1970, 1973	Nominated jointly with S.Bergström the only time by E.Klenk.
	Christian Klixbüll-Jørgensen	April 18, 1931; Aalborg, Denmark	January 9, 2001 near Paris, France	1970, 1973	
	David Mervyn Blow	June 27, 1931; Birmingham, England	June 8, 2004; Appledore, Torridge, England	1970	Jointly nominated with D.Ch.Phillips the only time by Jui Hsin Wang (1921–2016) from the Yale University
	David Chilton Phillips	March 7, 1924; Ellesmere, Shropshire, England	February 23, 1999; London, England	1970, 1971, 1972, 1974 (Note: “For their works on enzymatic reaction mechanisms”)	
	Boris Vladimirovich Derjagin	August 9, 1902; Moscow, Russia	May 16, 1994; Moscow, Russia	1970, 1971, 1973, 1974 (Note: “For their theoretical works on the stability of lyophobic colloids”)	
	Tetsuo Nozoe	May 16, 1902; Sendai, Japan	April 4, 1996; Tokyo, Japan	1970, 1971, 1972, 1973, 1974 (Note: “For his works on non-benzenoid aromatic compounds”)	
	Joseph Chatt	November 6, 1914; Horden, England	May 19, 1994; Hove, England	1970, 1971, 1973, 1974, (Note: “For his works on the coordination chemistry of transition elements”) 1975	
	Stig Melker Claesson	February 5, 1917; Kumla, Sweden	July 31, 1988; Helsingborg, Sweden	1970, 1974, (Note: “For their contributions to chemical kinetics”) 1975	Nominated by N.M.Emanuel only
	Nikolay Markovich Emanuel	October 1, 1915; Tim, Kursk Governorate, Russian Empire	December 7, 1984; Chernogolovka, Moscow Oblast, Russian Federation	1970, 1971, 1972, 1973, 1974, (Note: “For his contributions to chemical kinetics and its applications”) 1975	Nominated by N.N.Semyonov only and for the Nobel Prize in Physics too.
1971
	John Christian Bailar Jr.	May 27, 1904; Golden, Colorado, United States	October 17, 1991; Urbana, Illinois, United States	1971	Nominated jointly with J.Chatt the only time by R.Ch.Mehrotra
	Sir Ronald Sydney Nyholm	January 29, 1917; Broken Hill, New South Wales, Australia	December 4, 1971; Cambridge, England	1971	Nominated jointly with J.Chatt the only time by R.Ch.Mehrotra
	Christian Boehmer Anfinsen Jr.	March 26, 1916; Monessen, Pennsylvania, United States	May 14, 1995; Randallstown, Maryland, United States	1971, 1972	Shared the 1972 Nobel Prize in Chemistry (Note: “for his work on ribonuclease, especially concerning the connection between the amino acid sequence and the biologically active conformation”) with St.Moore and W.H.Stein.
	Henry Taube	November 30, 1915; Neudorf, Saskatchewan, Canada	November 16, 2005; Palo Alto, California, United States	1971, 1972, 1975	Won the 1983 Nobel Prize in Chemistry (Note: “for his work on the mechanisms of electron transfer reactions, especially in metal complexes”)
	Earl Wilbur Sutherland Jr.	November 19, 1915; Burlingame, Kansas, United States	March 9, 1974; Miami, Florida, United States	1971	Won the 1971 Nobel Prize in Physiology or Medicine. (Note: “for his discoveries concerning the mechanisms of the action of hormones”)
	John Hasbrouck Van Vleck	March 13, 1899; Middletown, Connecticut, United States	October 27, 1980; Cambridge, Massachusetts, United States	1971, 1973	Shared the 1977 Nobel Prize in Physics with Ph.W.Anderson and Sir N.F.Mott. (Note: “for their fundamental theoretical investigations of the electronic structure of magnetic and disordered systems)
	Leo Brewer	June 13, 1919; St. Louis, Missouri, United States	February 22, 2005; Lafayette, California, United States	1971	
	Setsuro Ebashi	August 31, 1922; Tokyo, Japan	July 17, 2006; Okazaki, Aichi, Japan	1971	Nominated the only time by Mohamad Khalil Salah from Assiut University
	Sidney Walter Fox	March 24, 1912; Los Angeles, California, United States	August 10, 1998; Mobile, Alabama, United States	1971	Nominated jointly with St.Ll.Miller the only time by S.F.Gomes da Costa from Lisbon
	Ralph Franz Hirschmann	May 6, 1922; Fürth, Bavaria, Germany	June 20, 2009; Lansdale, Pennsylvania, United States	1971	Nominated jointly with R.Br.Merrifield the only time by G.Losse from Dresden
	Albert Lester Lehninger	February 17, 1917; Bridgeport, Connecticut, United States	March 4, 1986	1971	Nominated jointly with B.L.(B.).Horecker and R.Br.Merrifield the only time by C.Baron from Dijon
	Alfred René Jean Paul Ubbelohde	December 14, 1907; Antwerp, Belgium	January 7, 1988; Etchingham, Sussex, England	1971	Nominated the only time by Liliana Jannelli (b.1921) from Bari
	Richard Tecwyn Williams	February 20, 1909; Abertillery, Wales, UK	December 29, 1979; Northwick Park Hospital, London, England, UK	1971	Nominated the only time by J.N.Smith from Wellington
	Richard Barry Bernstein	October 31, 1923; Long Island, New York, United States	July 8, 1990; Helsinki, Finland	1971, 1972 (Note: “Nominations 22032, 22055 and 22204 to Richard Barry Bernstein are hidden at the Nomination Archive site according to §8 of the statutes governing the Nobel archives of the Royal Swedish Academy of Sciences”)	(Note: “Data of Richard Barry Bernstein (id 16103) are hidden at the Nomination Archive site according to §8 of the statutes governing the Nobel archives of the Royal Swedish Academy of Sciences”)
	John Dombrowski Roberts	June 8, 1918; Los Angeles, California, United States	October 29, 2016; Pasadena, California, United States	1971, 1972	
	Andrew Reginald Howard (Andy) Cole	April 21, 1924; Perth, Western Australia, Australia	February 5, 2024; Western Australia, Australia	1971	Nominated jointly with P.J.Flory and Br.H.Zimm the only time by J.H.Gibbs
	Bruno Hasbrouck Zimm	October 31, 1920; Woodstock, New York, United States	November 26, 2005; La Jolla, San Diego, California, United States	1971, 1974 (Note: “For their experimental and theoretical works on the physical chemistry of macromolecules”)	Nominated jointly with P.J.Flory only
	Kochetkov, Nikolay Konstantinovich	May 18, 1915; Moscow, Russia	December 21, 2005; Moscow, Russia	1971, 1974 (Note: “For his works on glycosides”)	
	Stanley Lloyd Miller	March 7, 1930; Oakland, California, United States	May 20, 2007; National City, California, United States	1971, 1974 (Note: “For ... contributions to the knowledge of the molecular origin and development of life on earth”)	
	Jan Theodoor Gerard Overbeek	January 30, 1911; Groningen, Netherlands	February 19, 2007; National City, California, United States	1971, 1973, 1974	
	Josef Říman	January 30, 1925; Horní Suchá, Czechoslovakia	October 12, 2019; Prague, Czechia	1971, 1974 (Note: “For his works on certain viruses in molecular biology”)	
	Duilio Arigoni	December 6, 1928; Lugano, Switzerland	June 10, 2020	1971, 1972, 1973, 1974, (Note: “For his contributions to elucidating the chiral course of enzymatic reactions with achiral substrates”) 1975	
	Goldanskiy, Vitaliy Iosifovich	December 6, 1928; Vitebsk, Belarus	June 10, 2020; Moscow, Russia	1971, 1972, 1974, 1975	Nominated by N.M.Emanuel only and for Nobel Prize in Physics too
	Donald Holroyde Hey	September 12, 1904; Swansea, Wales, UK	January 21, 1987	1971, 1972, 1973, 1975	Jointly nominated only
	William Alexander Waters	May 8, 1903; Cardiff, Wales, UK	January 23, 1985; Oxford, England, UK	1971, 1972, 1973, 1975	Jointly nominated only
	Alfred Edward "Ted" Ringwood	April 19, 1930; Kew, Melbourne, Australia	November 12, 1993; Northwick Park Hospital, London, England, UK	1971, 1972, 1975	Nominated by K.S.Heier only
	Volpin, Mark Jefimowitsch	May 23, 1923; Simferopol, Crimea	September 28, 1996; Moscow, Russia	1971, 1972, 1974, (Note: “For their works on nitrogen fixation”) 1975	
1972
	William Nunn Lipscomb Jr.	December 9, 1919; Cleveland, Ohio, United States	April 14, 2011; Cambridge, Massachusetts, United States	1972, 1973, 1974, (Note: “For ... theoretical and experimental works on the structure and reactivity of boranes; For ... works on the bonding and structure of boranes and carborane-metal complexes; For ... works on enzymatic reaction mechanisms”) 1975	Won the 1976 Nobel Prize in Chemistry (Note: “for his studies on the structure of boranes illuminating problems of chemical bonding”)
	Rodney Robert Porter	October 8, 1917; Newton-le-Willows, Lancashire, England	September 6, 1985; Beacon Hill, Surrey, England	1972	Shared the 1972 Nobel Prize in Physiology or Medicine with G.M.Edelman (Note: “for their discoveries concerning the chemical structure of antibodies”)
	Ernst August Friedrich Ruska	December 25, 1906; Heidelberg, Grand Duchy of Baden, German Empire	May 27, 1988; West Berlin, Germany	1972, 1973	Shared the 1986 Nobel Prize in Physics (Note: “for his fundamental work in electron optics, and for the design of the first electron microscope”) with G.Binnig and H.Rohrer
	Alimarin, Ivan Pavlovich	September 11, 1903; Moscow, Russian Empire	December 17, 1989; Moscow, Russia	1972	Nominated jointly with Fr.Feigl the only time by Pandarinath Bhuvanendra Janardhan (b.1921) from the University of Madras
	Robert Sidney Cahn	June 9, 1899; Hampstead, London, England	June 15, 1981	1972	Nominated jointly with Chr.K.Ingold and Vl.Prelog the only time by Maurice (Maurits) Verzele (21.1.1923-1.9.2008) from Ghent
	Paul Mead Doty	June 1, 1920; Charleston, West Virginia, United States	December 5, 2011; Moscow, Russia	1972	Jointly nominated with J.Marmur the only time by J.L.Monod
	Trevor Walworth Goodwin	June 22, 1916; Neston, Cheshire, England	October 7, 2008	1972	Jointly nominated by Christiaan Frans van Sumere (10.2.1929-18.2.2018) from Ghent the only time
	Arthur Charles Neish	July 4, 1916; Granville Ferry, Nova Scotia, Canada	1973	1972	Jointly nominated by Christiaan Frans van Sumere (10.2.1929-18.2.2018) from Ghent the only time
	Herbert Sander Gutowsky	November 8, 1919; Bridgman, Michigan, United States	January 13, 2000; Urbana, Illinois, United States	1972	
	Louis Stevenson Kassel	December 31, 1905; Louisville, Kentucky, United States	January 14, 1973; Park Ridge, Illinois, United States	1972	Jointly nominated with H.Eyring the only time by George Wilse Robinson (1924-2000) from CalTech
	Oscar Knefler Rice	February 12, 1903; Chicago, United States	May 7, 1978; Chapel Hill, North Carolina, United States	1972	Jointly nominated with H.Eyring the only time by George Wilse Robinson (1924-2000) from CalTech
	Candin Liteanu	July 6, 1914; Ciugudu de Sus, Transylvania	May 31, 1990	1972	
	Johannes Kurt Meyer	March 31, 1904; Zwickau, German Reich	November 6, 1978; Wolfen, Germany	1972	Nominated the only time by D.J.Smith from New York
	Murtuza Fətulla oğlu Nağıyev	May 5, 1908; Sarab, East Azerbaijan, Iran	January 28, 1975; Baku, Azerbaijan	1972	Nominated the only time
	Carl Nordling	February 6, 1931	April 1, 2016	1972	Nominated jointly with K.M.B.Siegbahn the only time and for the Nobel Prize in Physics too
	Charles Louis Sadron	May 12, 1902; Cluis, France	September 5, 1993; Orléans, France	1972	Nominated the only time by Marie-Louise Dondon (b.1915) from Clermont-Ferrand
	George J. Schulz	April 29, 1925; Brno, Czechoslovakia	January 15, 1976; New Haven, Connecticut, United States	1972	Nominated by Florence Josephe Fayard from Orsay the only time and for the Nobel Prize in Physics too
	Philip S. Skell	December 30, 1918; Brooklyn, New York, United States	November 21, 2010	1972	Nominated the only time by Thomas Wartik (1921-2013) from the Penn State
	Arthur John Birch	August 3, 1915; Sydney, Australia	December 8, 1995; Canberra, Australia	1972, 1973	
	Viktor Gutmann	November 10, 1921; Vienna, Austria	July 16, 1998; Mödling, Austria	1972, 1973	
	Edwin Herbert Land	May 7, 1909; Bridgeport, Connecticut, United States	March 1, 1991; Cambridge, Massachusetts, United States	1972, 1973, 1974 (Note: “For his development of Polaroid film and the Land photographic process”)	Nominated by G.Porter only and for the Nobel Prize in Physics too
	Sir Alan Rushton Battersby	March 4, 1925; Leigh, Lancashire, England	February 10, 2018	1972, 1973, 1974 (Note: “For his works on the biogenesis of natural products”) 1975	
	Osamu Hayaishi	January 8, 1920; Stockton, California, United States	December 17, 2015; Kyoto, Japan	1972, 1973, 1974, (Note: “For his works on oxygenases”) 1975	
	Howard Stanley Mason	August 20, 1914; Melrose, Massachusetts, United States	2003	1972, 1975	Nominated jointly with Os. Hayaishi
	Julius Marmur	March 22, 1926; Białystok, Poland	May 20, 1996	1972, 1975	
	Shilov, Alexander Evgen'evich	January 6, 1930; Ivanovo, Russia	June 6, 2014; Chernogolovka, Moscow Oblast, Russia	1972, 1974, 1975	
	Michael Szwarc	June 9, 1909, Będzin, Poland	August 4, 2000; San Diego, California, United States	1972, 1974, (Note: “For his discovery of ""living"" polymers and other contributions to polymer chemistry”) 1975	
	Bernhard Witkop	May 9, 1917; Freiburg, Baden, German Empire	November 22, 2010; Chevy Chase, Maryland, United States	1972, 1975	
1973
	George Emil Palade	November 19, 1912; Iași, Kingdom of Romania	October 7, 2008; Del Mar, California, United States	1973	Shared the 1974 Nobel Prize in Physiology or Medicine with Alb.Claude and Chr.R.M.J.de Duve (Note: “for their discoveries concerning the structural and functional organization of the cell”)
	Howard Martin Temin	December 10, 1934; Philadelphia, Pennsylvania, United States	February 9, 1994; Madison, Wisconsin, United States	1973 (Note: “Nomination 22952 to Howard Martin Temin and David Baltimore is hidden at the Nomination Archive site according to §8 of the statutes governing the Nobel archives of the Royal Swedish Academy of Sciences”)	Shared the 1975 Nobel Prize in Physiology or Medicine with R.Dulbecco and D.Baltimore (Note: “for their discoveries concerning the interaction between tumour viruses and the genetic material of the cell”) (Note: “Data of Howard Martin Temin (id 16749) are hidden at the Nomination Archive site according to §8 of the statutes governing the Nobel archives of the Royal Swedish Academy of Sciences”)
	Andrzej Viktor "Andrew" Schally	November 30, 1926; Wilno, Poland	October 17, 2024; Miami Beach, Florida, United States	1973	Shared the 1977 Nobel Prize in Physiology or Medicine with R.Ch.L.Guillemin (Note: “for their discoveries concerning the peptide hormone production of the brain”) and R.S.Yalow
	Sten Harald Ahrland	August 4, 1921; Mariestad Municipality, Skaraborg County, Sweden	March 31, 1997; Lund Municipality, Skåne County, Sweden	1973	Jointly nominated by Sigeo Kida from Fukuoka the only time
	Ralph Gottfrid Pearson	January 12, 1919; Chicago, United States	October 12, 2022	1973	Jointly nominated by Sigeo Kida from Fukuoka the only time
	Erwin-Félix Lewy-Bertaut	February 9, 1913; Leobschütz, German Empire	November 6, 2003; Grenoble, France	1973	Nominated jointly with J.Lecomte and F.Trombe by Clément Raymond François Courty (b.1902) from the University of Lyon the only time
	Geoffrey Burnstock	May 10, 1929; London, England	June 2, 2020; Melbourne, Victoria, Australia	1973	Nominated by Henry McIlwain (1912-14.9.1992) from the Lond the only time
	Hermann Hartmann	May 4, 1914; Bischofsheim in der Rhön, German Empire	October 22, 1984; Glashütten, Germany	1973	Nominated jointly with Chr.Kl.Jørgensen and L.El. Orgel by Miguel Gayoso-Andrade (b. 1932) from Madrid the only time
	Clyde Allen Hutchison Jr.	May 5, 1913; Alliance, Ohio, United States	August 29, 2005; Chicago, United States	1973	Nominated the only time
	Hugh Esmor Huxley	February 25, 1924; Birkenhead, Cheshire, England	July 25, 2013; Woods Hole, Massachusetts, United States	1973	Nominated by Ralston Andrew Lawrie (1924-2007) from Nottingham the only time
	William Summer Johnson	February 24, 1913	August 19, 1995	1973	Nominated by David Alexander Harrison Taylor (b. 1.1.1927) from York the only time
	Wiktor Kemula	November 6, 1902; Izmail, Russian Empire	October 17, 1985; Warsaw, Poland	1973	Nominated by J.Hurwic the only time
	Włodzimierz Kołos	September 6, 1928; Pinsk, Polesie Voivodeship, then Poland	June 3, 1996	1973	Jointly nominated only
	Clemens C. J. Roothaan	August 29, 1918; Nijmegen, Netherlands	June 17, 2019	1973	Jointly nominated only
	Lutosław Tadeusz Wolniewicz	October 25, 1930; Toruń, Poland	December 19, 2020; Krępa, Poland	1973	Nominated jointly with Wł.Kołos and Cl.C.J.Roothaan only
	Hans Leo Kornberg	January 14, 1928; Herford, Province of Westphalia, Free State of Prussia, Germany	December 16, 2019; Boston, Massachusetts, United States	1973	Nominated by H.K.King from Aberystwyth the only time
	Edgar Lederer	June 5, 1908; Vienna, Austria-Hungary	October 19, 1988; Sceaux, Hauts-de-Seine, France	1973	Nominated the only time
	Fritz Ingvar Lindqvist	August 2, 1921; Kråksmåla, Nybro Municipality, Sweden	May 25, 1991; Gottsunda Parish, Sweden	1973	Nominated jointly with V.Gutmann by H.Malissa the only time
	Joseph Edward Mayer	February 5, 1904; New York, United States	October 15, 1983; Sceaux, Hauts-de-Seine, France	1973	Nominated by Mario Elliott Baur (1934-2003) from Los Angeles the only time
	Walter Thomas James Morgan	October 5, 1900; Ilford, England	February 10, 2003	1973	Nominated by W.M.Watkins the only time
	William Charles Price	April 1, 1909	March 10, 1993	1973	
	Kenzi Tamaru	November 2, 1923; Kamakura, Japan	July 22, 2020	1973	
	Leonhard Johann Eugen Tiganik	November 25, 1900; Võru, Estonia	February 9, 1974; Karlstad, Sweden	1973	Nominated by Emirhahn Gülbaran (b. 1920) from Istanbul the only time
	Hiroomi Umezawa	September 20, 1924; Kurihashi, Saitama, Japan	March 24, 1995; Edmonton, Alberta, Canada	1973	Nominated for the Nobel Prize in Physics too
	Paul von Ragué Schleyer	February 27, 1930; Cleveland, Ohio, United States	November 21, 2014; Ila, Georgia, United States	1973	Nominated jointly with H.Ch.Brown and G.Wittig by André Laurent from Lyon the only time
	Ying-Lai Wang	November 13, 1907; Kinmen, Fujian, Qing China	May 5, 2001; Shanghai, China	1973	Nominated by Frank Heron Churchward Kelly (1915-2005) from Singapore the only time
	Michael James Steuart Dewar	September 24, 1918; Ahmednagar, Ahmednagar District, Bombay Presidency, British India	October 10, 1997; Gainesville, Florida, United States	1973	Nominated jointly with H.G.H.Erdtman and Tetsuo Nozoe by K.Yagi the only time
	Evert Johannes Willem Verwey	April 30, 1905; Amsterdam, Netherlands	February 13, 1981; Utrecht, Netherlands	1973, 1974	Nominated jointly with B.V.Derjaguin and J.Th.G.Overbeek only
	Davydov, Alexander Sergeevich	December 26, 1912; Yevpatoria, Russian Empire	June 2, 2020; Kiev, Ukraine	1973, 1975	Nominated for Nobel Prize in Physics too
	Holger G. H. Erdtman	April 25, 1902; Ed, Sweden	December 13, 1989; Engelbrekt Parish, Stockholm, Sweden	1973, 1974, 1975	
	Erich Adler	October 24, 1905; Frankenreuth, Bayern, German Empire	December 26, 1985	1973, 1974, 1975	Nominated jointly with H.G.H.Erdtman and K.J.Freudenberg only
	Daniel Edward Koshland Jr.	March 30, 1920; New York, United States	July 23, 2007; Lafayette, California, United States	1973, 1974, (Note: “For their works in enzyme chemistry”) 1975	</ref>
	George Claude Pimentel	May 2, 1922; Rolinda, California, United States	June 18, 1989; Kensington, California, United States	1973, 1975	
	Michael Sela	March 2, 1924; Tomaszów Mazowiecki, Poland	May 27, 2022; Rehovot, Israel	1973, 1974, (Note: “For ... studies of soluble polypeptides as model substances for proteins and antigens”) 1975	Nominated jointly with Efr.Katzir-Katchalski only
1974
	Hubert Greenslade Britton	1925	October 3, 2017	1974	Jointly nominated with D.Edw.Koshland Jr. by S.Grisolía García the only time
	Helmut Holzer	June 14, 1921; Neuenbürg, Germany	August 22, 1997; Freiburg im Breisgau, Germany	1974	Jointly nominated with D.Edw.Koshland Jr. by S.Grisolía García the only time
	John Bannister Goodenough	July 25, 1922; Jena, Thuringia, German Reich	June 25, 2023; Austin, Texas, United States	1974, (Note: “For ... works on the relationship between physical properties and structure of solid substances”) 1975	Shared the 2019 Nobel Prize in Chemistry with M.St.Whittingham and Ak.Yoshino (Note: “for the development of lithium-ion batteries”)
	Bengt Ingemar Samuelsson	May 21, 1934; Halmstad, Sweden	July 5, 2024; Mölle, Sweden	1974, (Note: “For his works on the biosynthesis of phospholipids”) 1975	Shared the 1982 Nobel Prize in Physiology or Medicine with K.S.D.Bergström and J.R.Vane.
	Sidney William Benson	September 26, 1918; New York, United States	December 30, 2011; Brentwood, Los Angeles, United States	1974	Nominated jointly with St.M.Claesson and V.I.Goldanskiy by N.M.Emanuel the only time
	Elkan Rogers Blout	July 2, 1919; Manhattan, New York, United States	December 20, 2006; Boston, Massachusetts, United States	1974 (Note: “Nomination 24672 to E Blout is hidden at the Nomination Archive site according to §8 of the statutes governing the Nobel archives of the Royal Swedish Academy of Sciences”)	(Note: “Data of E Blout (id 18939) are hidden at the Nomination Archive site according to §8 of the statutes governing the Nobel archives of the Royal Swedish Academy of Sciences”)
	Bogolyubov, Nikolay Nikolayevich	August 21, 1909; Nizhny Novgorod, Russian Empire	February 13, 1992; Moscow, Russian Federation	1974 (Note: “For their works in statistical mechanics and thermodynamics”)	Jointly nominated with Il.R.Prigogine by N.M.Emanuel the only time and for the Nobel prize in Physics too
	Ryogo Kubo	February 15, 1920; Tokyo, Japan	March 31, 1995; Japan	1974	Jointly nominated with Il.R.Prigogine by N.M.Emanuel the only time and for the Nobel prize in Physics too
	Guillermo Carvajal-Sandoval	February 10, 1926; Ciudad Altamirano, Guerrero, Mexico	2008	1974 (Note: “For his biochemical works”)	Nominated the only time by R.Corona from Mexico
	Carlos Casas Campillo	October 12, 1916; Córdoba, Veracruz, Mexico	October 6, 1994; Mexico City, Mexico	1974 (Note: “For his microbiological research”)	Nominated the only time by R.Corona from Mexico
	Jesús Romo Armería	October 9, 1922; Aguascalientes, Mexico	May 14, 1977; Mexico City, Mexico	1974 (Note: “For his works in organic chemistry”)	Nominated the only time by R.Corona from Mexico
	Friedrich Cramer	September 20, 1923; Breslau, Lower Silesia, German Empire	June 24, 2003	1974 (Note: “For his works on the structure of tRNA”)	Nominated the only time by Walter K. Richard Franke (b. 11.7.1906, Breslau) from Darmstadt
	Günther Wilke	February 23, 1925; Heidelberg, Germany	December 9, 2016	1974 (Note: “For his works in catalytic chemistry”)	Nominated the only time by Walter K. Richard Franke (b. 11.7.1906, Breslau) from Darmstadt
	Heinz Gerischer	March 31, 1919; Wittenberg, Germany	September 14, 1994; Berlin, Germany	1974 (Note: “For his works on electrode reactions, especially at semiconductor electrodes”)	
	Paul Hagenmuller	August 3, 1921; Alsace, France	January 7, 2017; Gradignan, France	1974 (Note: “For his works on non-stoichiometric compounds, especially so-called bronzes; For ... works on the relationship between physical properties and structure of solid substances”)	
	Brian S. Hartley	April 16, 1926; Rawtenstall, Lancashire, England	May 3, 2021	1974 (Note: “For their works on enzymatic reaction mechanisms”)	Nominated jointly with William Nunn Lipscomb Jr. and D.Ch.Phillips the only time by G.Semenza
	Bo G. Malmström	May 11, 1927; Stockholm, Sweden	February 9, 2000; Gothenburg, Sweden	1974	Nominated jointly with William Nunn Lipscomb Jr. and D.Ch.Phillips the only time by G.Semenza
	Maurice Loyal Huggins	September 19, 1897; Berkeley County, West Virginia, United States	December 17, 1981	1974 (Note: “For their works on polymers”)	Nominated jointly with P.J.Flory the only time by Alexander Tkâc (17.5.1922-17.8.2012) from Bratislava
	Otto Wichterle	October 27, 1913; Prostějov, Moravia, Austria-Hungary	August 18, 1998; Stražisko, Czech Republic	1974	Nominated jointly with P.J.Flory the only time by Alexander Tkâc (17.5.1922-17.8.2012) from Bratislava
	Viktor Holger Hydén	January 31, 1917; Stockholm, Sweden	June 8, 2000; Gothenburg, Sweden	1974 (Note: “For his works on the chemical conditions of nerve cells”)	Nominated the only time by Hermann Schaltegger (1910-1985) from Bern
	David John Edward Ingram	1927	2001	1974	Nominated jointly with H.M.McConnell and Y.K.Zavoisky the only time by Alexander Tkâc (17.5.1922-17.8.2012) from Bratislava
	Ewart Ray Herbert Jones	March 16, 1911; Wrexham, Wales, United Kingdom	May 7, 2002	1974 (Note: “For his works on natural products, especially steroids”)	Nominated the only time by Harold Douglas Springall (24.6.1910-2.11.1982) from Keele
	Rex Edward Richards	October 28, 1922; Colyton, Devon, England	July 15, 2019	1974 (Note: “For his contributions to the development of NMR techniques and their application in the study of organic compounds structure and reactions”)	Nominated the only time by Harold Douglas Springall (24.6.1910-2.11.1982) from Keele
	Günter Victor Schulz	October 4, 1905; Łódź, Congress Poland, Russian Empire	February 25, 1999; Mainz, Germany	1974 (Note: “For ... works on the chemistry of high polymers”)	Nominated jointly with P.J.Flory the only time by Kazuhide Tani from Osaka
	Pierre Henri Souchay	November 27, 1914; La Ferté-Bernard, France	February 5, 1974; Paris, France	1974 (Note: “For his works on the structure and stability of coordination compounds”)	Nominated the only time by Jacques Faucherre (b. 1920) from Paris
	Тёмкин, Михаил (Менасий) Исаакович	September 16, 1908; Białystok, Grodno Governorate, Russian Empire	1991; Moscow, Russian Federation	1974 (Note: “For his works in catalytic chemistry”)	Nominated the only time by И.Я.Постовский
	Volkenshtein, Mikhail Vladimirovich	October 23, 1912; Saint Petersburg, Russian Empire	February 18, 1992; Moscow, Russian Federation	1974 (Note: “For his quantitative theory of polymer flexibility”)	Nominated the only time by Norman Love-lace Paddock (1918, Bath-25.6.2009, Victoria) from Vancouver
	Raimond Bernard René Castaing	December 28, 1921; Monaco	April 10, 1998; Clamart, France	1974, (Note: “For the discovery and development of microprobe techniques and their application in analytical chemistry and solid-state chemistry”) 1975	Nominated by R.Kiessling only and for the Nobel prize in Physics too
	Guy Henry Ourisson	March 26, 1926; Boulogne-Billancourt, France	November 4, 2006; Strasbourg, France	1974, (Note: “For new methods of stereospecific organic synthesis; For his works on natural products”) 1975	
	Leonidas Zervas	May 21, 1902; Megalopolis, Greece	July 10, 1980; Athens, Greece	1974, (Note: “For his works on the chemistry of proteins”) 1975	
1975
	Peter Dennis Mitchell	September 29, 1920; Mitcham, Surrey, England	April 10, 1992; Bodmin, Cornwall, England	1975	Won the 1978 Nobel Prize in Chemistry (Note: “for his contribution to the understanding of biological energy transfer through the formulation of the chemiosmotic theory”) and nominated for the Nobel Prize in Physics too
	Walter Gilbert	March 21, 1932; Boston, Massachusetts, United States	(aged 94)	1975	Shared the 1980 Nobel Prize in Chemistry with Fr.Sanger (Note: “for their contributions concerning the determination of base sequences in nucleic acids”) and P.Berg
	Benno Müller-Hill	February 5, 1933	August 11, 2018	1975	Jointly nominated with W.Gilbert only
	Aaron Klug	August 11, 1926; Želva, Lithuania	November 20, 2018; Cambridge, Cambridgeshire, England	1975	Awarded the 1982 Nobel Prize in Chemistry (Note: “for his development of crystallographic electron microscopy and his structural elucidation of biologically important nucleic acid-protein complexes”)
	Brian Frederic Carl Clark	July 26, 1936	October 6, 2014; Aarhus, Denmark	1975	Jointly (Note: “for their studies of the three-dimensional structure of t-RNA”) nominated with A.Klug the only time by Fr.Conconi
	Alexander Rich	November 15, 1924; Hartford, Connecticut, United States	April 27, 2015; Boston, Massachusetts, United States	1975	Jointly nominated with A.Klug the only time by Fr.Conconi
	John Anthony Pople	October 31, 1925; Burnham-on-Sea, Somerset, England	March 15, 2004; Chicago, Illinois, United States	1975	Shared the 1998 Nobel Prize in Chemistry (Note: “for his development of computational methods in quantum chemistry”) with W.Kohn
	Daniel Nathans	October 30, 1928; Wilmington, Delaware, United States	November 16, 1999; Baltimore, Maryland, United States	1975	Shared the 1978 Nobel Prize in Physiology or Medicine with W.Arber (Note: “for the discovery of restriction enzymes and their application to problems of molecular genetics”)
	Hamilton Othanel Smith	August 31, 1931; New York City, United States	October 25, 2025; Ellicott City, Maryland, United States	1975	Shared the 1978 Nobel Prize in Physiology or Medicine with W.Arber
	Herbert Wayne "Herb" Boyer	July 10, 1936; Derry, Pennsylvania, United States	(aged 90)	1975	Jointly nominated with D.Nathans and H.Oth.Smith only
	Otto Bayer	November 4, 1902; Frankfurt, Hesse, Germany	August 1, 1982; Burscheid, Rheinisch-Bergischer Kreis, North Rhine-Westphalia, Germany	1975	(Note: “for the discovery and technological development of the diisocyanate polyaddition process”)
	Helmut Beinert	November 17, 1913; Lahr, Germany	December 21, 2007; Madison, Wisconsin, United States	1975	(Note: “for his discovery of the chromophore of iron-sulfur proteins and studies of their biological significance”)
	Fernand Gallais	May 3, 1908	February 18, 2002	1975	(Note: “for his work on chemical bonding and coordination chemistry”)
	Santiago Grisolía García, 1st Marquess of Grisolía	January 6, 1923; Valencia, Spain	August 4, 2022; Valencia, Spain	1975	(Note: “for his enzymatic chemistry work and its biological applications”)
	Sören Jensen	June 4, 1927; Esbjerg, Denmark	September 3, 2023; Huddinge, Sweden	1975	(Note: “for identifying polychlorinated biphenyls as pollutants in the biosphere”)
	Joshua Jortner	March 14, 1933; Tarnów, Poland	(aged 93)	1975	
	Bengt Lindberg	July 17, 1919; Stockholm, Sweden	March 20, 2008	1975	(Note: “for his methods for studying the structure of polysaccharides”)
	Peter Adolf Reichard	September 1, 1925; Wiener Neustadt, Austria	June 18, 2018; Padua, Italy	1975	(Note: “for his work on the biosynthesis of pyrimidines and deoxyribonucleotides”)
	Max Schmidt	October 13, 1925; Vöhringen, Bavaria, Germany	April 22, 2002; Würzburg, Germany	1975	(Note: “for his work on sulfur chemistry, especially the discovery and synthesis of new sulfur modifications”)Nominated for the Nobel Prize in Physics too
	Koichi Shimoda	October 5, 1920; Urawa, Saitama, Japan	May 29, 2023	1975	(Note: “for his molecular spectroscopic work using lasers”)
	Shpolsky, Eduard Vladimirovich	September 23, 1892; Voronezh, Russia	August 21, 1975; Moscow, Russia	1975	(Note: “for his discovery of the so-called Spolskij effect and molecular spectroscopic investigations”)
	Paul Burgan Weisz	July 2, 1919; Plzeň, Czechoslovakia	September 25, 2012; State College, Pennsylvania, United States	1975	(Note: “for his work in catalytic chemistry”)
	Albert Derrick (Bert) Allen	1919; London, England	December 25, 1976; Cobourg, Ontario, Canada	1975	Jointly (Note: “for the discovery of stable coordination compounds of molecular nitrogen with transition elements and the reduction of nitrogen to hydrazine”) nominated with Al.E.Shilov only
	Jeffrey Lee Bada	September 10, 1942; San Diego, California, United States	September 1, 2024; San Diego, California, United States	1975 (Note: “for the amino acid dating method”)	Jointly nominated with K.S.D.Bergström only
	Hans-Dieter Beckey	June 8, 1921	June 18, 1992	1975	Jointly (Note: “for the development of field ion microscopy and mass spectrometry”) nominated with Erw.W.Müller only
	Jonathan Roger Beckwith	December 25, 1935; Cambridge, Massachusetts, United States	(aged 90)	1975	Jointly nominated only
	Donald David Brown	December 30, 1931; Cincinnati, Ohio, United States	May 31, 2023; Woodbrook, Baltimore County, Maryland, United States	1975	Jointly nominated only
	Baruch Joe Davis	1927	May 3, 2008	1975	Jointly (Note: “for their development of disc electrophoresis”) nominated the only time by Guido Reinhold Hartmann (1929-1992) from Munich
	Leonard Ornstein	1926	2013	1975	Jointly nominated the only time by Guido Reinhold Hartmann (1929-1992) from Munich
	Marion Frederick Hawthorne	August 24, 1928; Fort Scott, Kansas, United States	July 8, 2021	1975	Jointly (Note: “for their work on the structure and reactivity of boranes and carboboranes”) nominated with W.N.Lipscomb Jr. the only time by V.Gutmann
	Peter Erwin Leonhard Hemmerich	December 30, 1929	October 3, 1981; Konstanz, Germany	1975	Jointly (Note: “for their work on flavins, flavin derivatives and flavoproteins”) nominated the only time by M.J.Coon and Halvor Niels Christensen (1915-2003) from Ann Arbor
	Vincent Massey	November 28, 1926; Berkeley, New South Wales, Australia	August 26, 2002	1975	Jointly nominated the only time by M.J.Coon and Halvor Niels Christensen (1915-2003) from Ann Arbor
	Josef Meixner	April 24, 1908; Percha, Kingdom of Bavaria, German Empire	March 19, 1994; Aachen, Germany	1975	Jointly (Note: “for their work on the thermodynamics of irreversible processes”) nominated with Il.R.Prigogine the only time by R. P. Rastogi
	Ovchinnikov, Yuri Anatolyevich	August 2, 1934; Moscow, Russia	February 17, 1988; Moscow, Russia	1975	Jointly (Note: “for their chemical and biochemical investigations of cyclic organic compounds that specifically bind alkali metal ions”) nominated the only time by J.Zýka
	Wilhelm Simon	September 26, 1929; Fahrwangen, Switzerland	November 17, 1992	1975	Jointly nominated the only time by J.Zýka
	John Herbert Beynon	December 29, 1923; Ystalyfera, Wales	August 24, 2015; Swansea, Wales	1975	Jointly (Note: “for applications of mass spectrometry in organic chemistry”) nominated with Kl.Biemann the only time by Jaswant Rai Mahajan
	Fred Warren McLafferty	May 11, 1923; Evanston, Illinois, United States	December 26, 2021; Ithaca, New York, United States	1975	Jointly nominated with Kl.Biemann the only time by Jaswant Rai Mahajan
	Roy John Britten	October 1, 1919; Washington, D.C., United States	January 21, 2012; Costa Mesa, California, United States	1975	Jointly (Note: “for their work on recombination of separated DNA strands”) nominated with J.Marmur the only time by Bernhard Hirt (b. 1934)
	David Edward Kohne	August 20, 1937; Decatur, Indiana, United States	November 15, 2015; San Diego, United States	1975	Jointly nominated with J.Marmur the only time by Bernhard Hirt (b. 1934)
	Jean-Pierre Changeux	April 6, 1936; Domont, France	(aged 90)	1975	Jointly nominated the only time by Bernard William Agranoff (1926-2022)
	Arthur Beck Pardee	July 13, 1921; Chicago, Illinois, United States	February 24, 2019	1975	Jointly nominated the only time by Bernard William Agranoff (1926-2022)
	Sidney Udenfriend	April 5, 1918	December 29, 1999	1975	Jointly (Note: “for work on valence tautomerism and arene oxides and their significance in biological oxidation”) nominated with B.Witkop the only time by Os.Hayaishi
	Emanuel Vogel	December 2, 1927; Ettlingen, Germany	March 31, 2011; Karlsruhe, Germany	1975	Jointly nominated with B.Witkop the only time by Os.Hayaishi
	Levich, Veniamin Grigorievich (Benjamin)	March 30, 1917; Kharkiv, Ukraine	January 19, 1987; Englewood, New Jersey, United States	1975 (Note: “for his work in physicochemical hydrodynamics, particularly the effect of turbulent flow on reaction rates at surfaces”)	Jointly nominated with N.Bartlett, Howard H. Claassen, John G. Malm and Henry Selig the only time by John Tasman Davies (1924-1987) from Birmingham
1976
Nominees are typically published 50 years later (2026), so 1976 nominees should be published as of 2027.
				1976	

== See also ==
- List of Nobel laureates in Chemistry
- List of female nominees for the Nobel Prize in Chemistry
- List of nominees for the Nobel Prize in Physics
- List of nominees for the Nobel Prize in Literature
