= Enercity =

German regional energy company

Coordinates: 52.37318°N 9.71887°E

Enercity Aktiengesellschaft
- Type: Aktiengesellschaft
- Industry: Energy
- Founded: 21. December 1970
- Headquarters: Hanover, Germany
- Key people: Aurélie Alemany; Marc Hansmann; Dirk Schulte
- Revenue: €9.2 billion
- Number of employees: 3,373 (2023)
- Website: www.enercity.de

The Enercity Aktiengesellschaft (stylized as enercity; formerly Stadtwerke Hannover Aktiengesellschaft) in Hanover is a municipal energy supply and energy services company. Its revenue was €9.2 billion in 2023, and it employed more than 3,300 people across the group. In 2018, the brand name enercity became the official company name when Stadtwerke Hannover Aktiengesellschaft was renamed to enercity Aktiengesellschaft. The owners are Versorgungs- und Verkehrsgesellschaft Hannover (76%) and Thüga AG (24%).

== History ==
=== 1875–1922: Construction of the first gas, water, and electricity plants ===
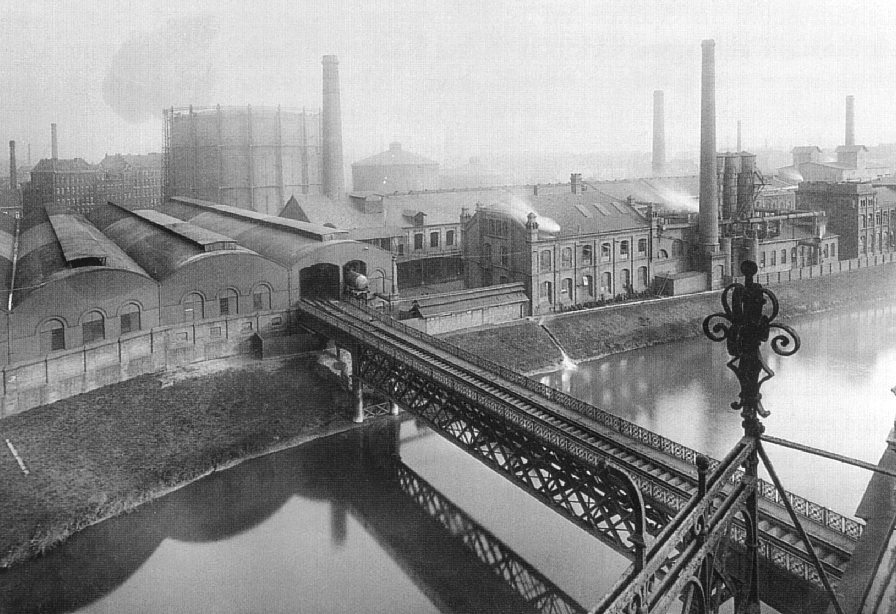
Glocksee gasworks on the Ihme, no longer in existence today

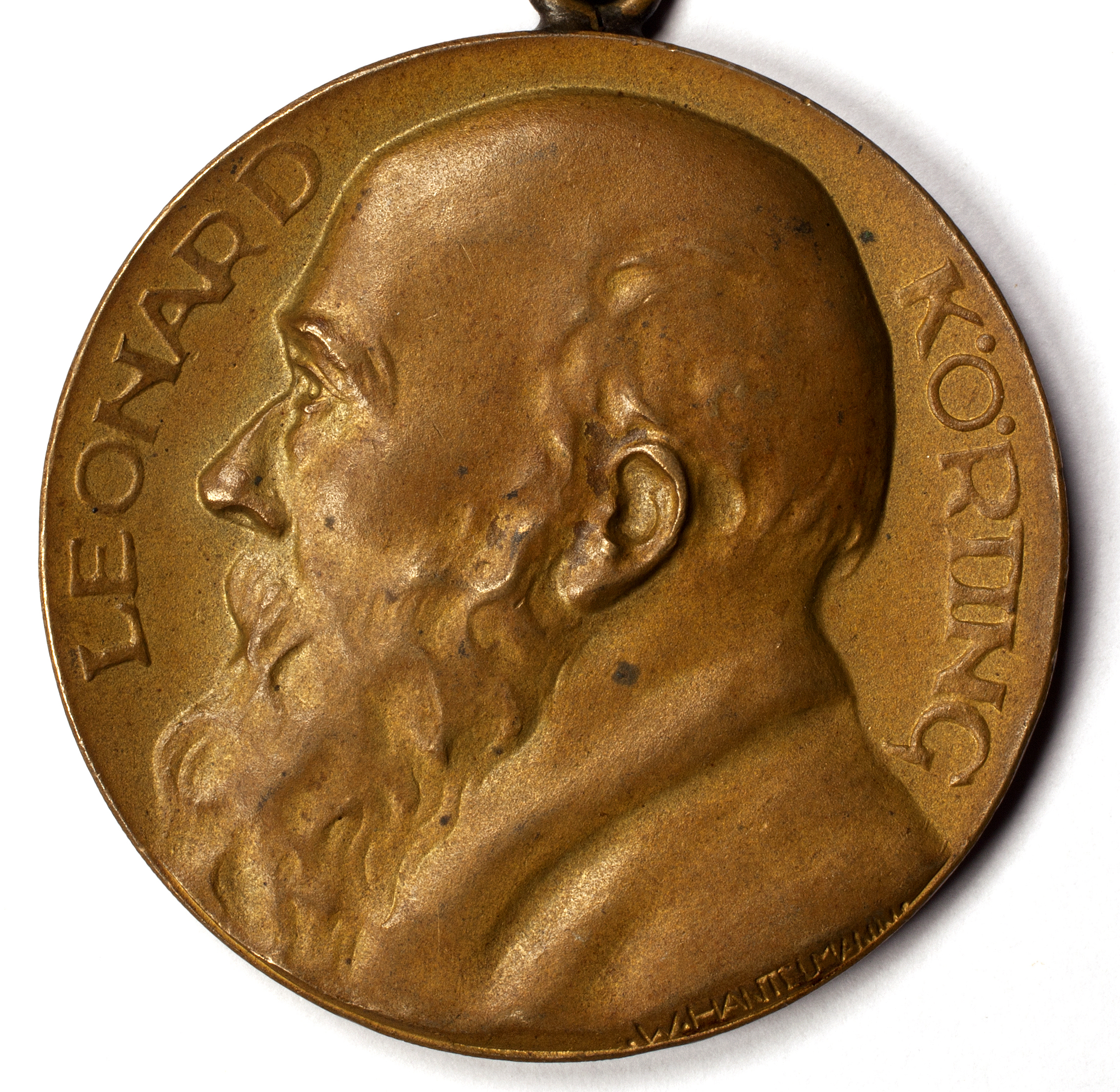
Medal with the portrait of the first director Leonard Körting

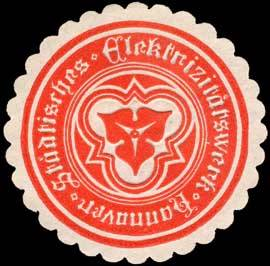
Seal stamp of the municipal power station of Hanover

Around the middle of the 16th century, Hannover had a water distribution system consisting of wells and pipelines, which remained in operation for over 300 years through continuous expansions and maintenance. In 1875, the city's magistrate decided to construct a groundwater plant in Ricklingen. The population of Hanover, exceeding 100,000, necessitated this decision as the simple wells could no longer meet the city's water demands. In 1878, the new waterworks in Ricklingen commenced operation, followed by the construction of facilities in Laatzen-Grasdorf in 1899 and at the Fuhrberger Feld near Fuhrberg in 1911.

As early as 1825, a contract was concluded with the London-based Imperial Continental Gas Association (ICGA), assigning the British company the task of replacing the old street lamps, which were still operated with tallow, with new gas lamps, and maintaining them. In the same year as the contract was signed, the Glocksee gasworks was built, becoming Germany's first gas plant.

In 1883, following the Ricklingen waterworks and the Glocksee gasworks, a combined plant for generating electrical energy was established. Finally, in 1891, the first electricity plant in Osterstraße was connected to the grid.

=== Städtische Betriebswerke and Stadtwerke Hannover, conversion into a stock corporation ===
In 1922, the individual water, electricity, and gas works were merged into a single company: the Städtische Betriebswerke. During the Third Reich, the operational facilities were also brought under Nazi control. Additionally, during World War II, at least 123 forced labourers were employed.

The period following World War II was initially marked by energy supply problems. Through reconstruction efforts and the post–World War II economic expansion, the Städtische Betriebswerke also benefited. New facilities were established, and the expansion of networks into previously undeveloped areas was promoted. In 1952, the Städtische Betriebswerke were renamed Stadtwerke Hannover. The heating power plant Linden, which commenced operations in 1962, laid the foundation for the company's district heating network.

The economic upswing of the 1950s and 1960s brought double-digit growth rates to the Stadtwerke Hannover, prompting the City Council of Hanover to decide in November 1970 to transform the utility facilities into a joint-stock company. On December 21, 1970, the state capital of Hanover became the sole shareholder of Stadtwerke Hannover AG. The conversion of the Stadtwerke Hannover into a joint-stock company was necessary to consolidate Stadtwerke Hannover and Üstra under the holding company Versorgungs- und Verkehrsgesellschaft Hannover mbH (VVG). Among other things, this enabled the profits of Stadtwerke Hannover to be offset against Üstra's losses.

The natural gas business began in the early 1970s. In 1982, the first cavern storage facility in Empelde was put into operation, and in 1989, the Gemeinschaftskraftwerk Hannover (joint power plant Hannover) in Stöcken commenced operations. The first unit of the Stöcken coal-fired power plant is scheduled to be gradually shut down starting from late 2024 as part of the coal phase-out.

=== Since the 1990s: Energy transition ===
As a result of the increasing liberalization of energy markets, in 1996, the Stadtwerke Hannover became Enercity.

Since the early 1990s, the company has been committed to the use of biomass for heat and power generation. The largest project in this regard is the acquisition of shares in Danpower GmbH in 2006.

With the decision to transition towards renewable energies, Enercity began shifting its focus from fossil fuels to renewables in the 2010s. From 2015 to 2023, Susanna Zapreva chaired the company; she played a significant role in implementing this change in direction. In 2019, Enercity acquired Gamesa Energie Deutschland GmbH, a project development company based in Oldenburg, from Siemens Gamesa, aiming to increase its investments in onshore wind power plants. Subsequently, among other ventures, Enercity purchased 166 wind turbines from the Norderland Group in East Frisia.

In 2022, the share of electricity from renewable energy sources was approximately 51%, while for heat generation it was around 21%. According to the company, the goal is to achieve a renewable energy share of 85% by 2030. The company's coal phase-out is scheduled to begin in 2024 and if possible be completed by 2026, but no later than 2030. Together with the city of Hanover, a plan has been developed to achieve climate neutrality in electricity and heat by 2035.

== Company structure ==
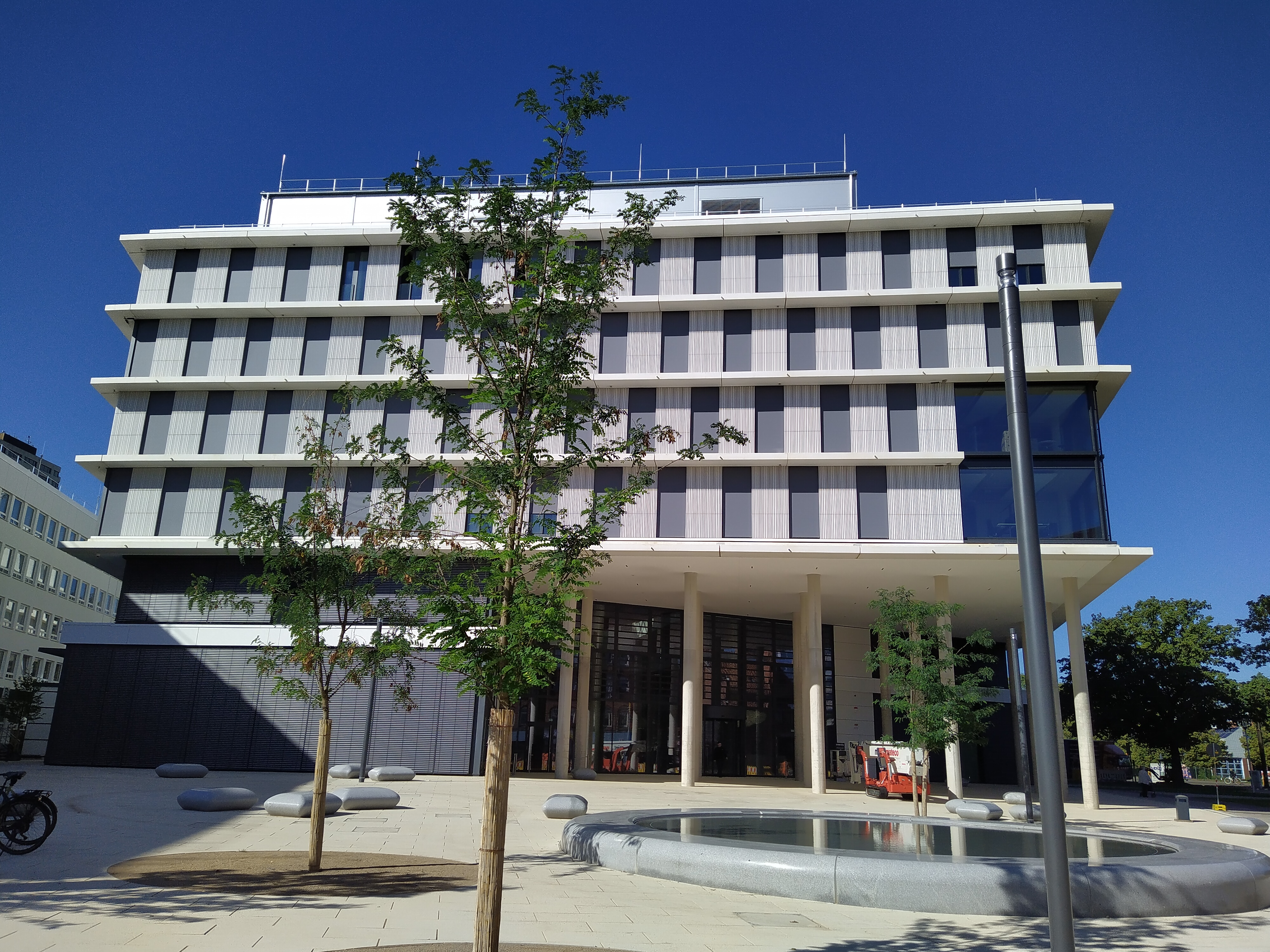
Main administration building

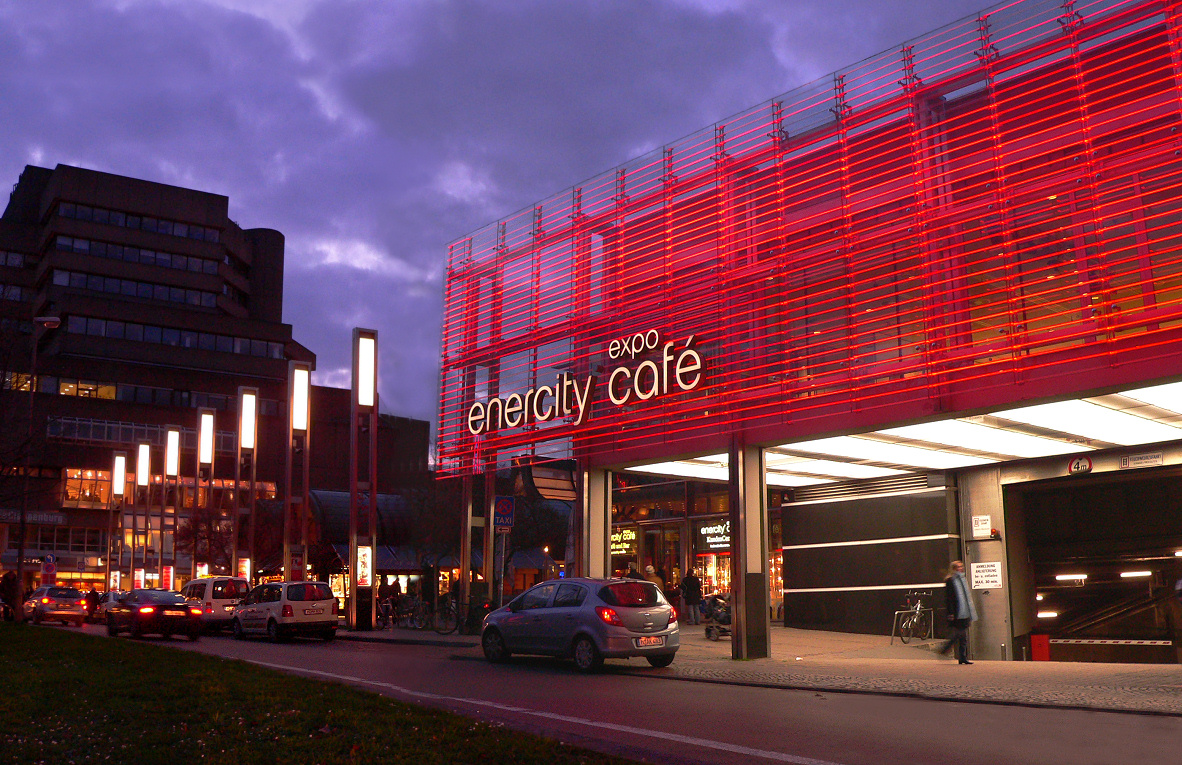
Illuminated wall of the Enercity CustomerCenter at Kröpcke

In 2023, Enercity AG achieved a revenue of approximately €9.2 billion. It offers electricity, solar energy, heat, district heating, e-mobility, intelligent technologies, and drinking water.

From 1975 to 2023, the head office was located in the Ihme-Zentrum in Hanover's Linden-Mitte district; since August 2023, it has been located in a new building on the Glocksee site in Calenberger Neustadt. Enercity's customer centre is located in central Hanover, near Kröpcke.

Enercity's share capital is owned by Versorgungs- und Verkehrsgesellschaft Hannover (VVG) at 76%. Another 24% is held by Thüga AG, headquartered in Munich, in which Enercity AG is also a shareholder. A significant portion of the company's profits is returned to VVG and the city of Hanover through profit distribution and concession fees. Enercity holds several stakes in energy companies in the Hanover region and operates the business for the two major power plants in the districts of Stöcken and Linden, as well as for the gas storage facility in Empelde.

== Business segments and products ==
The company supplies over 700,000 people in the Hanover region with electricity, natural gas, district heating, drinking water and energy services.

=== Electricity ===
Since January 1, 2018, Enercity has been supplying its private customers nationwide with 100% green energy sourced from solar, wind, biomass, and water. Enercity operates numerous power plants in Hannover for electricity and district heating production: the Heizkraftwerk Linden (Linden combined heat and power plant) in Linden-Nord, the Herrenhausen power plant in Leinhausen, and, in collaboration with VW, the coal-fired Gemeinschaftskraftwerk Hannover in Stöcken, which is planned to be phased out gradually starting from late 2024 and no later than 2030. The plan is to replace coal power in the future with sources including waste heat, recycled wood, waste utilization, and sewage sludge incineration.

=== Wind and solar ===
In 2019, Enercity supplied approximately 628,000 megawatt-hours of wind energy. In 2022, around 60 wind farms with 166 wind turbines were acquired from the Norderland Group in East Frisia. The transaction was completed in January 2023. As of 2023, Enercity owned 83 wind farms with 348 wind turbines.

With its subsidiary, Enercity solution GmbH, Enercity offers photovoltaic systems for purchase nationwide in Germany. In addition to providing components and installation, customers receive services such as remote monitoring, maintenance, and insurance. In 2022, Enercity installed the largest rooftop photovoltaic system in Hanover at the Expo Park Hanover. Enercity has entered into partnerships with the City of Hanover and the State of Lower Saxony, enabling them to install photovoltaic systems on the roofs of public buildings.

=== Heating ===
Enercity offers natural gas, district heating, and heat pumps as heating options. Following the principle of combined heat and power, waste heat from electricity generation is supplied to customers as space or process heat. As part of the heat transition, Enercity plans to expand district heating. Additionally, the company is investing in geothermal energy, large heat pumps, and industrial waste heat as heat generators.

As an additional energy source, Enercity offers natural gas, which is delivered directly to homes via pipelines and can be used, for example, for heating and cooking. The gas is mainly sourced from natural gas storage facilities, such as Gasspeicher Hannover GmbH, or is produced in biogas plants.

Beyond Hanover, the subsidiaries Enercity Contracting and Danpower were working with more than 300 municipalities in the area of heat supply as of 2022.

=== Electromobility ===
Since 2010, Enercity has been expanding electric vehicle charging stations in Hanover and has been providing public and semi-public charging points for electric cars, e-bikes, and electric scooters in Hanover and the surrounding area. In December 2020, Enercity opened its 1000th charging point. In fall 2023, Enercity launched the easygo app to help users find electric vehicle charging points. Enercity also offers charging facilities for private customers at their residences and for businesses.

Enercity collaborates with Üstra to implement DC fast charging stations. In 2023, Enercity announced the installation of 72 charging points for electric cars at Hannover Airport.

=== Glass fiber ===
In 2021, around 27,000 private households and 600 commercial customers used fiber optic connections from Enercity. The company plans to connect 150,000 households to fiber optic technology by 2030.

=== Water ===
Three waterworks, in Elze-Berkhof, Fuhrberg and Grasdorf, supply over 700,000 people in Hanover and the surrounding region with drinking water. In total, Enercity feeds around 42 million cubic meters of water into the network every year.

== Shareholdings (selection) ==
=== Danpower GmbH ===
Danpower GmbH is a nationwide operating heating supply and contracting company based in Potsdam. It specializes in decentralized energy supply and renewable energies through combined heat and power generation and the use of biomass. Since 2006, Enercity has been involved with Danpower, and in 2018, Enercity became the sole shareholder of Danpower GmbH.

=== Enercity Contracting GmbH ===
In January 2009, Enercity founded the wholly owned subsidiary Enercity Contracting GmbH, which takes over Enercity's sales activities in the contracting business segment (construction and operation of decentralized energy plants on behalf of customers).

=== Enercity Erneuerbare GmbH ===
Enercity Erneuerbare GmbH is a company based in Leer. Its business area is the planning, construction, operation and acquisition of plants for the generation of energy from renewable sources, in particular wind farms and photovoltaics, as well as the marketing of renewable energy.

=== Enercity Netz GmbH ===
The Enercity Netz GmbH is a wholly owned subsidiary of Enercity AG. The company's scope of business includes operating energy supply networks for the purpose of providing electricity and gas via pipelines, as well as operating and maintaining measuring devices and collecting consumption data for electricity and gas. Thus, it functions as a distribution network operator and metering service provider.

=== Enercity Solution GmbH ===
Enercity Solution GmbH is a subsidiary of Enercity for the solar sector. Among other things, it is responsible for the construction of PV systems on buildings in the state of Lower Saxony and offers PV systems for sale.

=== Enercity-Fonds proKlima GbR ===
The climate protection fund proKlima founded in 1998, is financed by the cities of Hanover, Hemmingen, Laatzen, Langenhagen, Ronnenberg, and Seelze (together forming the proKlima funding area) as well as by Enercity. The company contributes approximately 75% of the annual fund volume of around €4.4 million. Until 2023, proKlima approved funding of approximately €52 million for around 38,500 measures. The allocation of funds is based on defined criteria: CO_{2} efficiency, absolute CO_{2} reduction, multiplier effect, and the level of innovation of the measures are relevant. In 2023, around 1,500 applications totaling €4.2 million in grants were approved, primarily focusing on applications in the heating sector.

=== Energie-Projektgesellschaft Langenhagen mbH ===
The Energy Project Company Langenhagen mbH is jointly owned by the City of Langenhagen and Enercity, each holding a 50% stake. The company was founded in 1994. One focus is district heating supply through the use of combined heat and power plants. The company's business areas include planning, construction, and operation of efficient electricity and heat production facilities at the municipal level. A key focus is the district heating supply to residential buildings and other structures through the use of combined heat and power plants.

=== Gasspeicher Hannover GmbH ===
Together with Erdgas Münster GmbH, Enercity owns a joint venture, Gasspeicher Hannover GmbH (GHG), in which Enercity holds a 68.35% stake. GHG operates the Empelde gas vaults, a natural gas storage facility with four vaults in Ronnenberg-Empelde.

=== Gemeinschaftskraftwerk Hannover GmbH ===
The power generation plant Gemeinschaftskraftwerk Hannover was established in collaboration with the Volkswagen plant in Hanover and the Continental AG in Hanover-Stöcken. It covers the entire process and space heating demand of VW commercial vehicles as well as the base load of district heating and electricity for Enercity's supply area. With a purchase agreement dated June 23, 2010, Enercity acquired a 10.2% stake in Gemeinschaftskraftwerk Hannover GmbH from Continental Reifen Deutschland GmbH. Enercity now holds a stake of 84.7%. The plant can meet up to 50% of Hanover's electricity demand. Its decommissioning is planned for no later than 2030.

=== Gemeinschaftskraftwerk Hannover-Linden GmbH ===
In the Linden combined heat and power plant in Hanover-Linden (Gemeinschaftskraftwerk Hannover-Linden GmbH), Enercity holds a 90% stake. In 2013, as the largest single investment of the company up to that point, €155 million were allocated to modernize and make the combined heat and power plant more environmentally friendly. The plan is to convert the Linden combined heat and power plant from natural gas to hydrogen by 2035.

=== HTP GmbH ===
Starting from 1996, the former Stadtwerke Hannover AG marketed its own telecommunications network to control its facilities through a specially established company. HTP GmbH is a telecommunications company operating in the Hanover, Hildesheim, Braunschweig, Peine, Wolfenbüttel, and Hameln-Pyrmont areas with over 100,000 residential and business customers (as of 2020). Enercity holds 50% of the shares in HTP, while the remaining 50% are held by EWE AG based in Oldenburg. HTP GmbH and Enercity cooperate in the construction of fiber optic cables in Hanover.

=== Ökoloco ===
In 2023, Enercity acquired a majority stake in the Essen-based company Ökoloco, which operates in the field of heating system sales, heating system replacement, and heating system maintenance. Ökoloco's focus is on heat pumps and heating technology.

=== Rockethome ===
In 2021, Enercity acquired a stake in the Cologne-based IoT provider Rockethome. Rockethome works in the field of digitalization of real estate and municipalities.

=== Stadtwerke Wunstorf GmbH & Co. KG ===
The Stadtwerke Wunstorf GmbH & Co. KG supplies approximately 10,000 households and businesses with electricity, natural gas, and heat in the Wunstorf region. The majority of shares are held by the City of Wunstorf through the municipal baths. In addition to E.ON Avacon AG, Enercity holds a 34% stake.

=== Thüga Holding GmbH & Co. KG aA ===
In December 2009, a group of municipal companies, with Enercity's participation, acquired all shares in Thüga AG through Thüga Holding GmbH & Co. KGaA from E.ON Ruhrgas AG. Enercity holds a stake of 20.53%, while Mainova from Frankfurt and N-ERGIE from Nuremberg also hold stakes of the same proportion.

=== Former holdings ===
Enercity had an 83.3% share in the Mehrum power plant, which was operated with hard coal and was taken over by the Czech energy supplier EPH in 2017.

== Sponsoring and engagement ==
On April 8, 2011, with the support of the City of Hanover, the Enercity hardship fund (enercity Härtefonds e. V.)was founded. The association aims to help avoid social hardships related to electricity, gas, and water disconnections and is endowed with an annual budget of €150,000. It is the result of a lengthy consultation process involving social and regulatory stakeholders from the social sector.

Since 2010, Enercity has been the jersey sponsor for the Handball-Bundesliga club TSV Hannover-Burgdorf.

Enercity is the main sponsor of the Enercity Leinewelle, an artificial wave opened in 2023 in the Leine river. Located in the Old Town of Hanover, it can be used for surfing. Enercity contributed a significant portion of the construction costs totaling around €2 million, and in return, the Leinewelle bears the company name until 2033.

Since 2005, the Open-Air music festival Swinging Hannover, organized by the Jazz Club Hannover on Ascension Day, has had Enercity as its main sponsor and has officially been named Enercity swinging hannover. Enercity also supports the Johann-Jobst-Wagenersche Foundation.

== Maschsee Fountain ==
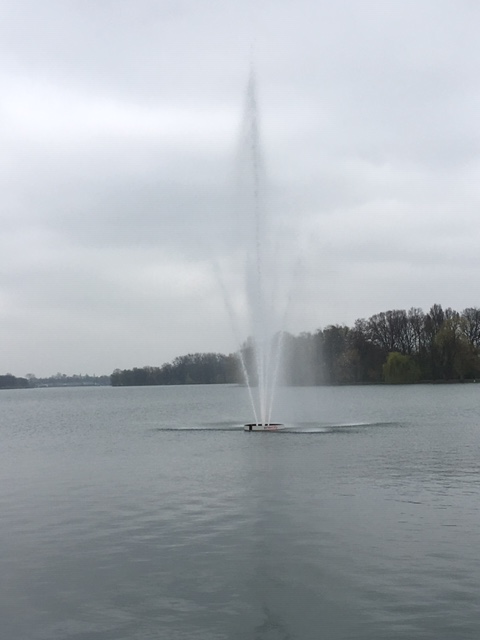
Maschsee fountain

The Maschsee Fountain (Maschseefontäne) is located on the northern shore of the Maschsee in Hanover and was a gift to the city of Hanover on the occasion of the 50th anniversary of Enercity AG. It was commissioned in 1987, and since then, Enercity has been responsible for maintenance as well as the electricity costs. In 2020, LED lights were installed for energy-efficient lighting in the evening and on special occasions.

== See also ==
- Electricity sector in Germany
- List of power stations in Germany
- RWE, Germany's largest electric power generator

== Literature ==
- Walter, Theo; Mundhenke, Herbert (1953). "Die Strassenbeleuchtung der Stadt Hannover von 1815–1835. Ein Beitrag zum 125jährigen Jubiläum des hannoverschen Gaswerks". Hannoversche Geschichtsblätter. 7 (1). Hanover: Hahnsche Buchhandlung.
- Olaf Grohmann, Olaf (1999). "Geschichte der Wasser- und Energieversorgung der Stadt Hannover. Von den Anfängen bis zur Gegenwart". Stadtwerke Hannover AG, p. 148–155, 202–207, 240–244.
- Ertel, Rainer. "Stadtwerke Hannover AG". Stadtlexikon Hannover, p. 587f.
