= Irsching Power Station =

German power station

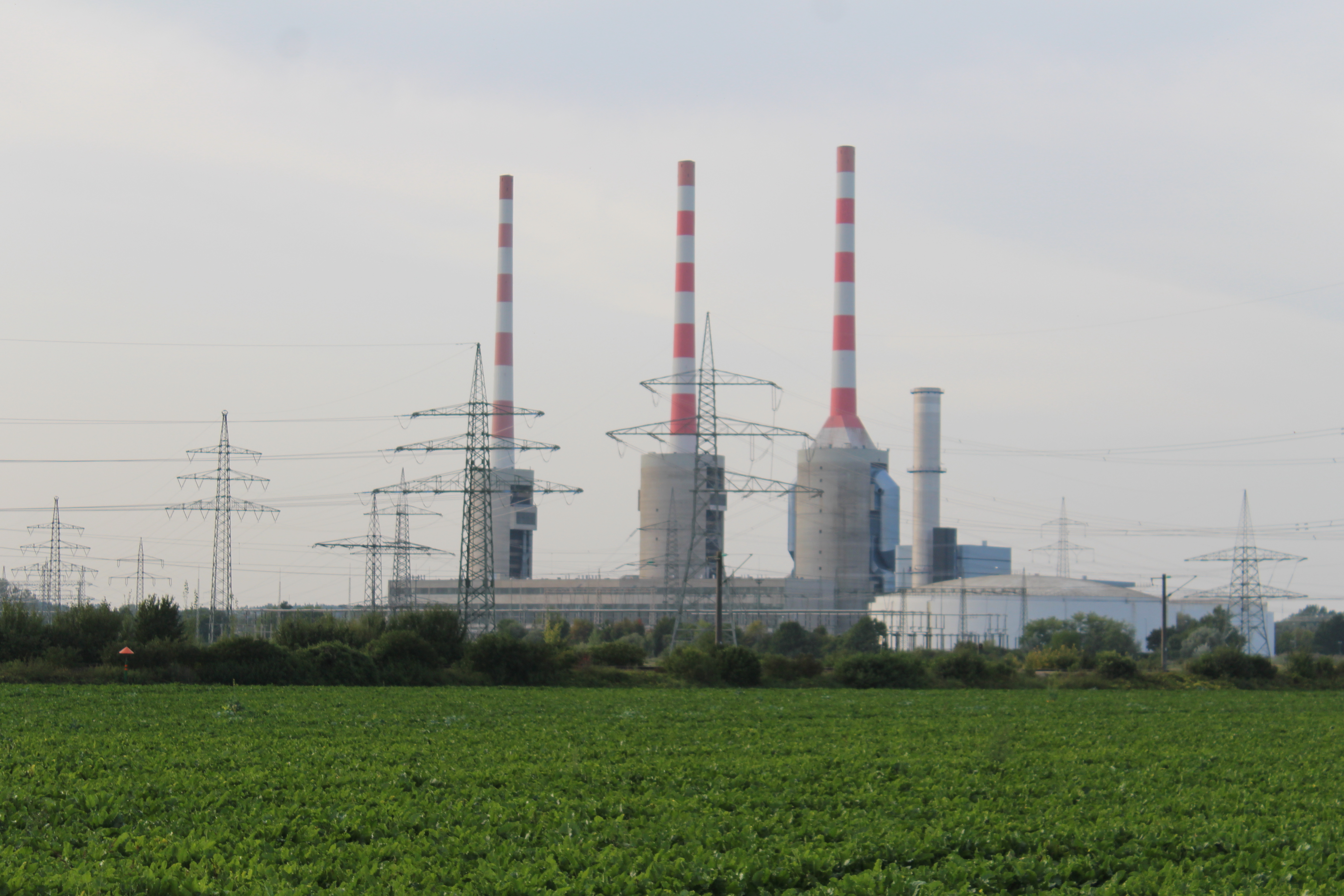
- Country: Germany
- Location: Vohburg
- Coordinates: 48°46′03″N 11°34′48″E
- Status: Operational
- Commission date: 1969 (Unit 1); 1972 (Unit 2); 1974 (Unit 3); 2010 (Unit 5); 2011 (Unit 4)
- Decommission date: 1995 (Unit 2); 2006 (Unit 1)
- Owners: Uniper (Units 1–4); Gemeinschaftskraftwerke Irsching (Unit 5)
- Operator: Uniper

Thermal power station
- Primary fuel: Natural gas (Units 4 and 5)
- Secondary fuel: Fuel oil (Units 1–3)
- Site elevation: 357 m (1,171 ft)
- Combined cycle?: Yes (Units 4 and 5)

Power generation
- Units operational: 150 MW (Unit 1; closed); 330 MW (Unit 2; cold stand-by); 440 MW (Unit 3); 569 MW (Unit 4); 860 MW (Unit 5)
- Make and model: Siemens
- Nameplate capacity: 2,199 MW
- Annual net output: 0.02 TW·h (2018); 0.04 TW·h (2019); 0.06 TW·h (2014); 0.13 TW·h (2017); 0.2 TW·h (2016); 0.57 TW·h (2015)

External links
- Commons: Related media on Commons

Irsching Power Station near Vohburg at the Danube, Germany, is operated as a so-called peaking power plant.

From the original three units only unit 3 with a capacity of 415 MW is operated, the older two units, with a capacity of 151 MW (unit 1) and 312 MW (unit 2), are in cold reserve. The power station can be operated with light fuel oil and with natural gas. The owner and operator of the units 3 and 4 is Uniper, a formally subsidiary of E.ON Energy, while Unit 5, also operated by Uniper, is owned by Gemeinschaftskraftwerke Irsching, a joint venture of Uniper, Nuremberg's N-ERGIE, Mainova and HEAG Südhessische Energie.

On December 20, 2007, a planned 18-month trial operation period of Siemens SGT5-8000H, the world's largest and most powerful gas turbine (capable of generating 375MW), started. After trial period the plant expanded to a high-efficiency combined-cycle power plant with a total output of about 570 MW and an efficiency of 60%. The unit 4 was commissioned in 2011.

An additional unit 5 was built, consisting of two smaller gas turbines and one steam turbine. This unit has capacity of 860 MW of electricity with an efficiency of 58%. It was commissioned in 2010.

Due to the growth of Renewable energy in Germany which often covers daytime peak demand with solar power, the owners claim that they lose several million € a year. On March 30, 2015, the owners of unit 5, organised as Gemeinschaftskraftwerk Irsching GmbH (GKI), declared they wanted to close down all of its operations effective from April 1, 2016. This was denied, as due to the shutdown of nuclear power, network operator TenneT considers all power plants in its Southern German area as system relevant and having to remain as stand-by reserve. The operators demand better compensation for that.

Another request for shutdown of unit 5 was denied in August 2017, as Tennet again demanded from GKI that, according to Netzreserveverordnung, unit 5 remains operational, despite double digit M€ losses. GKI claims that Tennet plans to build similar gas powered peaker plants which are, unlike GKI's unit 5, entitled to compensation.
