= Reversible solid oxide cell =

rSOC working principle in the electrolysis and fuel cell operations.

A reversible solid oxide cell (rSOC) is a solid-state electrochemical device that is operated alternatively as a solid oxide fuel cell (SOFC) and a solid oxide electrolysis cell (SOEC). Similarly to SOFCs, rSOCs are made of a dense electrolyte sandwiched between two porous electrodes. Their operating temperature ranges from 600 °C to 900 °C, hence they benefit from enhanced kinetics of the reactions and increased efficiency with respect to low-temperature electrochemical technologies.

When utilized as a fuel cell, the reversible solid oxide cell is capable of oxidizing one or more gaseous fuels to produce electricity and heat. When used as an electrolysis cell, the same device can consume electricity and heat to convert back the products of the oxidation reaction into valuable fuels. These gaseous fuels can be pressurized and stored for a later use. For this reason, rSOCs are recently receiving increased attention due to their potential as an energy storage solution on the seasonal scale.

== Technology description ==
=== Cell structure and working principle ===
Reversible solid oxide cells (rSOCs), as solid oxide fuel cells, are made of four main components: the electrolyte, the fuel and oxygen electrodes, and the interconnects.

The electrodes are porous layers that favor the reactants diffusion inside their structure and catalyze electrochemical reactions. In the single technologies like SOFCs and SOECs, the electrodes serve a single purpose, hence they are called with their specific names. The anode is where the oxidation reaction occurs, while the cathode is where the reduction reaction takes place. In reversible solid oxide cells, on the other hand, both modalities can occur alternatively in the same device. For this reason, the generic names of fuel electrode and oxygen electrode are preferred instead. On the fuel electrode the reactions involving the fuel oxidation (SOFC modality) or the reduction of the products to produce the fuel (SOEC modality) takes place. On the oxygen electrode, oxygen reduction (SOFC modality) or oxygen ions oxidation to form oxygen gas (SOEC modality) takes place.

State-of-the-art materials for rSOCs are those used for SOFCs. The most common fuel electrodes are made by a mixture of nickel, that serves as electronic conductor, and yttria-stabilized zirconia (YSZ), a ceramic material characterized by high conductivity to oxygen ions at elevated temperature. The most popular oxygen electrode materials are lanthanum strontium cobalt ferrite (LSCF) and lanthanum strontium chromite (LSC), perovskite materials able to catalyze oxygen reduction and oxide ion oxidation reactions.

The electrolyte is a solid-state layer placed between the two electrodes. It is an electric insulator, it is impermeable to gas flow but permeable to oxygen ions flow. Hence, the main properties of this component are the high ion conductivity and the low electrical conductivity. When the rSOC is operated in SOFC mode, oxygen ions flow from the oxygen electrode to the fuel electrode, where the fuel oxidation occurs. In SOEC mode, the reactants are reduced in the anode with the production of oxygen ions, which flow towards the oxygen electrode. The most widespread material for electrolytes is YSZ.

The interconnects are usually made of metallic materials. They provide or collect the electrons involved in the electrochemical reactions. In addition, they are shaped internally with gas channels to distribute the reactants over the cell surface.

=== Polarization curve ===
An example of a rSOC polarization curve.

The most common tool to characterize the performances of a reversible solid oxide cell is the polarization curve. In this chart, the current density is related to operating voltage of the cell. The usual convention is the one of positive current density for the fuel cell operation, and negative current density for the electrolysis operation. When the rSOC electrical circuit is not closed and no current is extracted or supplied to the cell, the operating voltage is the so-called open circuit voltage (OCV). If the composition of the gas in the fuel electrode and the oxygen electrode are the same for both modalities, the polarization curve for the SOEC mode and the SOFC have the same OCV. When some current density is extracted or supplied to the cell, the operating voltage starts to diverge from the OCV. This phenomenon is due to the polarization losses, which depend on three main phenomena:

- the activation losses, predominant at very low current densities;
- the ohmic losses, increasing linearly with the current density;
- the concentration losses, occurring at very high current density, when the reactants inside the electrode get depleted.

The sum of the polarization losses takes the name of overpotential.

Other than the open circuit voltage, another fundamental theoretical voltage can be defined. The thermoneutral voltage $V_{TN}$ depends on the enthalpy of the overall reaction taking place in the rSOC and the number of charges that are transferred within the electrochemical reactions. Its relationship with the operating voltage gives information about the heat demand or generation inside the cell.

$$V_{TN} = \frac{\Delta H^0}{zF}$$

During the electrolysis operation:

- if $V_{SOEC} < V_{TN}$, the reaction is endothermic;
- if $V_{SOEC} > V_{TN}$, the reaction is exothermic.

The fuel cell operation, instead, is always exothermic.

=== Chemistry ===
Various chemistries can be considered when dealing with reversible solid oxide cells, which in turn can influence their operating conditions and overall efficiency.

==== Hydrogen ====
When hydrogen and steam are considered as reactants, the overall reaction takes this form:

$$\ce{H2 + 1/2 O2 <=> H2O}$$

where the forward reaction occurs during SOFC mode, and the backward reaction during SOEC mode. On the fuel electrode, hydrogen oxidation (forward reaction) takes in SOFC mode and water reduction (backward reaction) takes plain SOEC mode:

$$\ce{H2 + O^2- <=> H2O + 2e-}$$

On the oxygen electrode, oxygen reduction (forward reaction) occurs in SOFC mode and oxide ions oxidation (backward reaction) occurs in SOEC mode:

$$\ce{O2 +2e- <=> O^2-}$$

The thermoneutral voltage for steam electrolysis is equal to 1.29 V.

==== Carbonaceous reactants ====
Differently than low-temperature electrochemical technologies, rSOCs can process also carbon containing species with reduced risk of catalyst poisoning. Methane can be internally reformed on the Ni particles to produce hydrogen, similarly to what happens in steam reforming reactors. Subsequently, the produced hydrogen can undergo the electro-oxidation. Moreover, when working in SOEC modality, water and carbon dioxide can be co-electrolyzed to generate hydrogen and carbon monoxide to form syngas mixtures with various composition.

The reactions taking place on the oxygen electrode are the same considered for the hydrogen/steam case. Even if characterized by much slower kinetics with respect to the one involving hydrogen and steam, the direct electro-oxidation of carbon monoxide (forward reaction) or the direct electro-reduction of carbon dioxide (backward reaction) can be considered as well:

$$\ce{CO + 1/2 O2 <=> CO2}$$

The thermoneutral voltage of the $\ce{CO2}$ electrolysis is equal to 1.48 V.

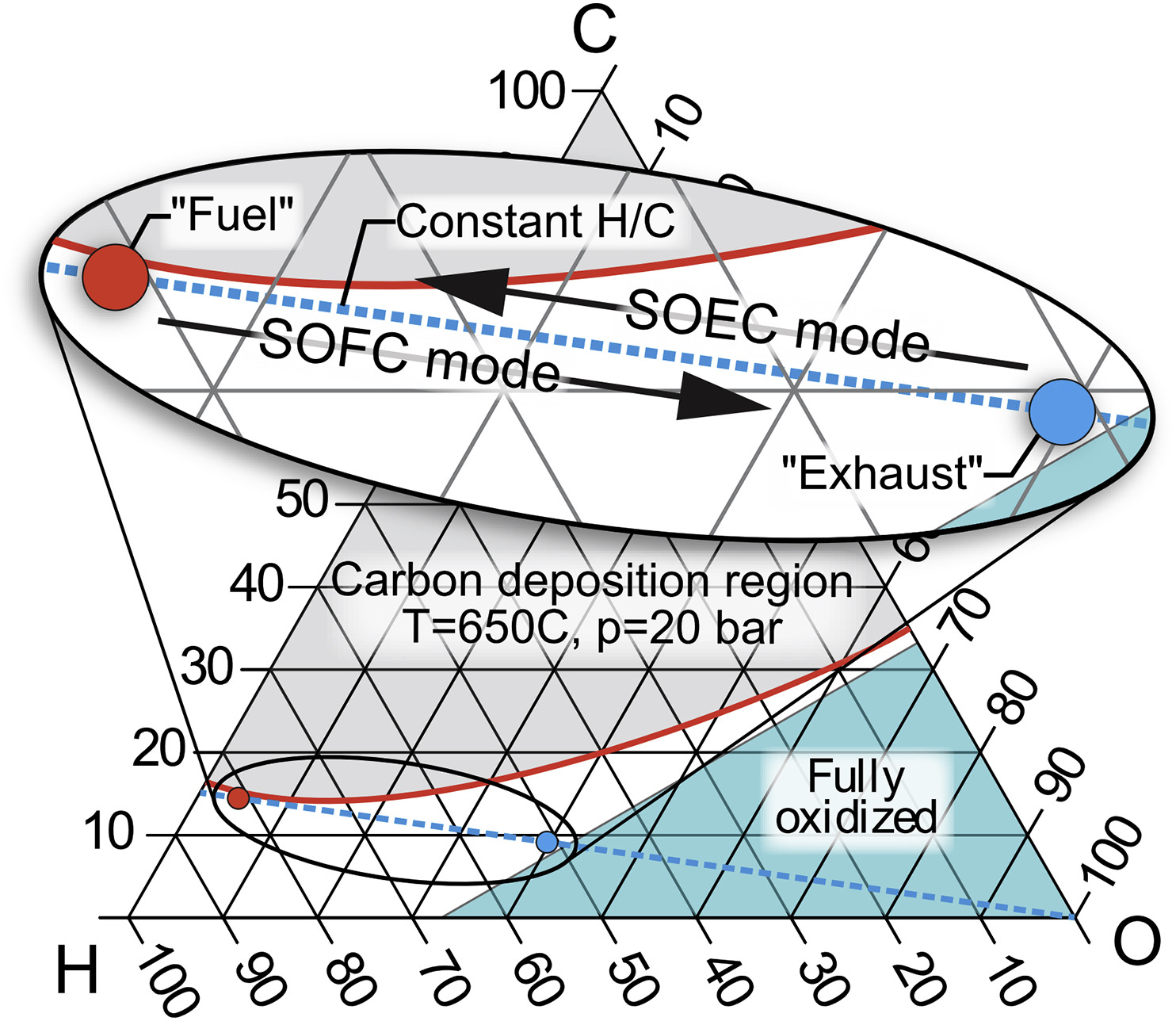
Example of cycling between fuel and exhaust in the C-H-O ternary diagram.

One useful way to depict the cycling between SOFC and SOEC mode of the rSOC operation with carbonaceous reactants is the C-H-O ternary diagram. Each point in the diagram represents a gas mixture with a different number of carbon, hydrogen or oxygen atoms. When dealing with the operation on reversible solid oxide cells, three distinct regions can be distinguished in the graph. For different operating conditions (i.e., different temperature and pressure), distinct boundary lines between these regions can be drawn. The three regions are:

- the carbon deposition region: gas mixtures lying in this region are characterized by compositions that are prone to carbon deposition on the fuel electrode;
- the fully oxidized region: this region is characterized by gas mixtures that are fully oxidized, hence they cannot be used as fuels in the rSOC;
- the operating region: this region is characterized by gas mixtures that are suitable for the rSOC operation.

In the operating region, the fuel mixture and the exhaust mixture can be depicted. These two points are connected by a line which runs through points characterized by a constant H/C ratio. In fact, during the rSOC operation in both modalities, the gases on the fuel electrode exchange with the oxygen electrode only oxygen atoms, while hydrogen and carbon are confined inside the fuel electrode. During the SOFC operation, the composition of the gas in the fuel electrode moves towards the boundary line of the fully oxidized region, increasing its oxygen content. During SOEC operation, on the other hand, the gas mixture evolves away from the fully oxidized region towards the carbon deposition region, while reducing its oxygen content.

==== Ammonia ====
An alternative chemistry for rSOCs is that one involving ammonia conversion to hydrogen and nitrogen. Ammonia has great potential as hydrogen carrier, due to its higher volumetric density with respect to hydrogen itself, and it can be directly fed to SOFCs. It has been demonstrated that ammonia-fed SOFCs operate through successive ammonia decomposition and hydrogen oxidation:

$$\ce{2NH3 -> N2 + 3H2}$$

$$\ce{H2 + O^2- -> H2O + 2e-}$$

Ammonia decomposition has been demonstrated to be slightly more efficient than simple hydrogen oxidation, confirming the great potential of ammonia as a fuel other than an energy carrier.

Unfortunately, ammonia cannot be directly synthesized on the fuel electrode of a rSOC, because the equilibrium reaction

$$\ce{N2 + 3H2  <=>  2NH3}$$

is completely shifted towards the left at their higher than 600 °C working temperature. For this reason, for clean ammonia production, hydrogen production via electrolysis must be coupled with nitrogen production from air with hydrogen oxidation and subsequent water separation.

== rSOC systems for energy storage ==
Reversible solid oxide cells are receiving increased attention as energy storage solutions for the weekly or the monthly scale. Other technologies for large scale electrical storage such as pumped-storage hydroelectricity and compressed air energy storage are characterized by geographical limitations. On the other hand, Li-ion batteries suffer from limited discharge capabilities. In this regard, hydrogen storage is a promising alternative, since the produced fuel can be compressed and stored for months. Among all hydrogen technologies, rSOCs are definitely the best candidates for producing and converting back hydrogen into electricity. Due to their high operating temperature, they are characterized by higher efficiency, compared to technologies like PEM fuel cells or PEM electrolyzers. Moreover, the possibility to operate both the fuel oxidation and the electrolysis on the same device is beneficial on the capacity factor of the system, helping at reducing its specific investment cost.

=== Roundtrip efficiency ===
When dealing with rSOCs, the most important parameter to consider is the roundtrip efficiency, which is a measure of the efficiency of the system considering both the charge (SOEC) and discharge (SOFC) preocesses. The roundtrip efficiency for the single cell can be defined as:

$$\eta_{RT,cell} = \frac{Q_{FC}V_{FC}}{Q_{EC}V_{EC}}$$

where $Q$ is the charge supplied or consumed during the reactions, and $V$ is the operating voltage. If the assumption of no current or reactants leakage is made, the exchanged charges during the reactions can be assumed to be equal. Then, the roundtrip efficiency can be written as:

$$\eta_{RT,cell} = \frac{V_{FC}}{V_{EC}}$$

To maximize the roundtrip efficiency, the two operating voltages must be as close as possible. This condition can be achieved by operating the rSOC with low current densities in both modalities. In SOFC mode this is easily pursuable, while in SOEC mode a too low voltage may lead to an endothermic operation. If the operating voltage in SOEC mode is lower than the thermoneutral voltage, additional heat sources at high temperature are needed to sustain the reaction. These could come from waste industrial heat or from nuclear reactors. If not easily accessible, though, electrical heating is necessary. This can be supplied by external additions or by operating the cell with an operating voltage higher than the thermoneutral one. Both solutions, though, would inevitably lower the roundtrip efficiency of the rSOC. For this reason, in reversible operation, the thermoneutral voltage poses significant limitations in achieving high roundtrip efficiencies.

On the other hand, the thermoneutral voltage is greatly affected by the reaction chemistry. It has been demonstrated that increasing the yield of methane in the electrolysis operation can substantially decreases the thermoneutral voltage and heat demand of the reaction. For conventional electrolyzers (operating at atmospheric pressure and 750 °C), the methane content in the products is very low. It can be increased effectively by lowering the operating temperature to 600 °C and increasing the operating pressure up to 10 bar. For example, the thermoneutral voltage is equal to 1.27 V at 750 °C and 1 bar, while it becomes equal to 1.07 V at 600 °C and 10 bar. In these conditions, the rSOC can even be operated in exothermic mode at reduced voltages, permitting to produce additional heat at high temperature. This result becomes very helpful in the design of high efficiency rSOC systems for energy storage purposes.

=== System configurations ===
Single reversible solid oxide cells can be arranged in series to form stacks. Single stacks can be then arranged in modules to reach power capabilities in the order of kilowatts or megawatts.

One of the most challenging aspects in designing large rSOC systems for energy storage purposes is the thermal integration. When the rSOC is operated in electrolysis mode, thermal power is needed for the operation of the system. Thermal power must be provided at two different temperature levels. Heat is needed for water operation, and additional heat at high temperature may be needed if the SOEC modality is endothermic. The latter requirement can be avoided if the rSOC is operated with an exothermic reaction in SOEC modality, with a negative effect on the roundtrip efficiency. On the other hand, when the rSOC is operated in fuel cell mode, the reaction is characterized by a high exothermicity. A number of works in the scientific literature have proposed the exploitation of a Thermal energy storage (TES) to ease the thermal integration of the system.

Excess heat from the SOFC operation can be recovered and stored in a TES, and later used for the SOEC operation. Thermal energy storage typologies and heat transfer fluids that have been considered for this purpose are those used for Concentrated solar power (CSP) technologies. Diathermic oil can be used to store heat at relatively low temperature (for instance, 180 °C) and exploited for water evaporation. Alternatively, phase-change materials characterized by high fusion points can be used to store heat at high temperature and enable the endothermic operation in the electrolysis mode. In this case, usually, rSOCs operate at different temperature levels in the two modalities (for example, 850 °C in SOFC mode and 800 °C in SOEC mode).

If carbonaceous chemistries are employed, the beneficial effect of methane synthesis inside the cell can be exploited to reduce the heat request of the electrolysis mode. In this regard, systems operating at high pressure and lower temperature (20 bar and 650 °C) have been proposed to reduce or even eliminate the thermal power requirement of the rSOC system. Alternatively, the production of methane can be favored in external reactors. The methanation reaction is exothermic and favored at low temperature.

$\ce{CO + 3H2 <=> CH4 + H2O}$ $\qquad \Delta H^0=-206\, \mathrm{kJ/mol}$.

The syngas that produced by the co-electrolysis can undergo a further reaction in one or multiple methanation reactors to produce methane and generate low-temperature heat for water evaporation. In addition, the formation of methane in such systems may be beneficial to the size of the tanks used for storing the fuels. In fact, methane is characterized by a higher volumetric energy density than hydrogen in the gaseous form.

When computing the roundtrip efficiencies of rSOC systems, the definition must take into account the net electric consumption (or additional electric production) of other components inside the system. The set of these component is regarded as balance of plant (BOP), and may comprehend pumps, compressors, expanders or fans, needed for fluid circulation and processing inside the system. Therefore, the system roundtrip efficiency can be defined as:

$$\eta_{RT,system} = \frac{P_{el,FC}+P_{BOP,FC}}{P_{el,EC}+P_{BOP,EC}}$$

where:

- $P _{el,FC}$ is the electric power produced in SOFC mode;
- $P _{el,EC}$ is the electric power consumed in SOEC mode;
- $P _{BOP,FC}$ is the net electric power consumption (negative) or production (positive) by the BOP in FC mode;
- $P _{BOP,EC}$ is the net electric power consumption (negative) or production (positive) by the BOP in EC mode.

The roundtrip efficiencies achievable with rSOC systems operating with steam and hydrogen can reach values in the order of 60%. On the other hand, systems exploiting the beneficial effects of methane formation, either inside the rSOC or in external reactors, can reach roundtrip efficiencies in the order of 70% and beyond.

== See also ==
- High temperature electrolysis
- Solid oxide fuel cell
- Solid oxide electrolyzer cell
- Power-to-gas
- Energy storage
- Grid energy storage
- Thermal energy storage
- Hydrogen technologies
