= Reach code =

Building code in California, US

Reach code is a California term describing locally adopted building codes intended to cut greenhouse gas emissions to meet climate targets. The term specifically applies to local codes that "reach" beyond minimum state requirements of the California Building Standards Code.

== Prescriptive codes ==
=== Electrification ===
Some reach codes would require electric utilities for cooking, water heating, and central heating. This is intended to eliminate use of fossil fuels like natural gas, heating oil, or coal for those purposes.

=== Transportation ===
Some reach codes attempt to encourage electric cars as replacements for automobiles with internal combustion engines. Such codes might require installation of 240-volt charging equipment to provide faster charging than is available with typical 120-volt power outlets.

== Performance codes ==
Performance codes require a building to perform more efficiently based on accepted computer modeling. Examples include thermal insulation of living spaces and hot water piping. Roundtrip efficiency for energy storage batteries would be another option. Some reach codes include water efficiency measures to conserve both water and the energy required to treat and pump it.
