= P2Y =

P2Y may refer to:

- Consolidated P2Y, a flying boat maritime patrol aircraft
- P2Y receptor, a family of G protein-coupled receptors
- Power-to-X
