= Substitute natural gas =

Type of fuel gas

Substitute natural gas (SNG), or synthetic natural gas, is a fuel gas (predominantly methane, CH_{4}) that can be produced from fossil fuels such as lignite coal, oil shale, or from biofuels (when it is named bio-SNG) or using electricity with power-to-gas systems.

SNG in the form of liquefied natural gas (LNG) or compressed natural gas (CNG) can be used in road, rail, air and marine transport vehicles as a substitute for costly fuels like diesel and petrol. The carbon footprint of SNG derived from coal is comparable to that of petroleum products. Bio-SNG has a much smaller carbon footprint compared to petroleum products. Liquefied petroleum gas (LPG) can also be produced by synthesising SNG with partial reverse hydrogenation at high pressure and low temperature. LPG is more easily transportable than SNG, more suitable as fuel in two-wheeler or smaller horsepower vehicles and engines, and also fetches higher price in international markets due to short supply.

Renewable electrical energy can also be used to create SNG (methane) via for example electrolysis of water or via a proton-exchange membrane fuel cell (PEMFC) in reverse to create hydrogen, which is then reacted with CO_{2} from for example, CSS/U Utilisation in the Sabatier reaction.

CO_{2} + 4H_{2} → CH_{4} + 2H_{2}O

== Distribution ==
It is advantageous to distribute SNG and bio-SNG together with natural gas in a gas grid. In this way, the production of renewable gas can be phased in at the same rate as the production capacity is increased. The gas market and infrastructure the natural gas has contributed is a condition for large scale introduction of renewable biomethane produced through anaerobic digestion (biogas) or gasification and methanation bio-SNG.

== Projects ==
The Great Plains Synfuels Plant injects approximately 4.1 million m^{3}/day of SNG from lignite coal into the United States national gas grid. The production process of SNG at the Great Plains plant involves gasification, gas cleaning, shift, and methanation. China is constructing nearly 30 nos massive SNG production plants from coal / lignite with aggregate annual capacity of 120 billion standard cubic meters of SNG. SNG can be produced from low rank coal/lignite using hydrogen. When hydrogen is used in place of oxygen/air, the gasification process is called hydrogasification.

== See also ==
- Landfill gas
- Renewable natural gas
- Oil shale gas
- Power to gas
