= Methanation =

Conversion of carbon monoxide and carbon dioxide (CO_{x}) to methane (CH_{4})

Methanation is the conversion of carbon monoxide and carbon dioxide (CO_{x}) to methane (CH_{4}) through hydrogenation. The methanation reactions of CO_{x} were first discovered by Sabatier and Senderens in 1902.

CO_{x} methanation has many practical applications. It is a means of carbon oxide removal from process gases and is also being discussed as an alternative to PROX in fuel processors for mobile fuel cell applications.

Methanation as a means of producing synthetic natural gas has been considered since the 1970s. More recently it has been considered as a way to store energy produced from solar or wind power using power-to-gas systems in conjunction with existing natural gas storage.

== Chemical reactions ==
The following reactions describe the methanation of carbon monoxide and carbon dioxide respectively:

$\ce{CO + 3H2 -> CH4 + H2O}$ △H = -206 kJ/mol
$\ce{CO2 + 4H2 -> CH4 + 2 H2O}$ △H = -164 kJ/mol

The methanation reactions are highly exothermic and release significant amounts of heat during reaction completion.

There is disagreement on whether the CO_{2} methanation occurs by first associatively adsorbing an adatom hydrogen and forming oxygen intermediates before hydrogenation or dissociating and forming a carbonyl before being hydrogenated. CO is believed to be methanated through a dissociative mechanism where the carbon-oxygen bond is broken before hydrogenation with an associative mechanism only being observed at high H_{2} concentrations. There are several adsorption mechanisms for methanation.

Methanation reaction over different carried metal catalysts including Ni, Ru and Rh has been widely investigated for the production of CH_{4} from syngas and other power to gas initiatives. Nickel is the most widely used catalyst due to its high selectivity and low cost.

== Industrial applications ==
=== Creation of synthetic natural gas ===
Methanation is an important step in the creation of synthetic or substitute natural gas (SNG). Coal or wood undergo gasification which creates a producer gas that must undergo methanation in order to produce a usable gas that just needs to undergo a final purification step.

The first commercial synthetic gas plant opened in 1984 and is the Great Plains Synfuel plant in Beulah, North Dakota. It is still operational and produces 1500 MW worth of SNG using coal as the carbon source. In the years since its opening, other commercial facilities have been opened using other carbon sources such as wood chips.

In France, the AFUL Chantrerie, located in Nantes, started in November 2017 the demonstrator MINERVE. This methanation unit of 14 Nm3/day was carried out by Top Industrie, with the support of Leaf. This installation is used to feed a CNG station and to inject methane into the natural gas boiler.

=== Ammonia synthesis ===
In ammonia production CO and CO_{2} are considered poisons to most commonly used catalysts. Methanation catalysts are added after several hydrogen producing steps to prevent carbon oxide buildup in the ammonia synthesis loop as methane does not have similar adverse effects on ammonia synthesis rates.

== See also ==
- Biological methanation
- Biomethane
- Hydrogen economy
- Renewable natural gas
- Sabatier reaction
