= Carbon-neutral fuel =

Type of fuel which have no net greenhouse gas emissions

Carbon-neutral fuel is fuel which produces no net-greenhouse gas emissions or carbon footprint. In practice, this usually means fuels that are made using carbon dioxide (CO_{2}) as a feedstock. Proposed carbon-neutral fuels can broadly be grouped into synthetic fuels, which are made by chemically hydrogenating carbon dioxide, and biofuels, which are produced using natural CO_{2}-consuming processes like photosynthesis.

The carbon dioxide used to make synthetic fuels may be directly captured from the air, recycled from power plant flue exhaust gas or derived from carbonic acid in seawater. Common examples of synthetic fuels include ammonia and methane, although more complex hydrocarbons such as gasoline and jet fuel have also been successfully synthesized artificially. In addition to being carbon neutral, such renewable fuels can alleviate the costs and dependency issues of imported fossil fuels without requiring either electrification of the vehicle fleet or conversion to hydrogen or other fuels, enabling continued compatible and affordable vehicles. In order to be truly carbon-neutral, any energy required for the process must be itself be carbon-neutral or emissions-free, like renewable energy or nuclear energy.

If the combustion of carbon-neutral fuels is subject to carbon capture at the flue, they result in net-negative carbon dioxide emission and may thus constitute a form of greenhouse gas remediation. Negative emissions are widely considered an indispensable component of efforts to limit global warming, although negative emissions technologies are currently not economically viable for private sector companies. Carbon credits are likely to play an important role for carbon-negative fuels.

== Production of synthetic hydrocarbons ==
Synthetic hydrocarbons can be produced in chemical reactions between carbon dioxide, which can be captured from power plants or the air, and hydrogen. The fuel, often referred to as electrofuel, stores the energy that was used in the production of the hydrogen.

Hydrogen fuel is typically prepared by the electrolysis of water in a power to gas process. To minimize emissions, the electricity is produced using a low-emission energy source such as wind, solar, or nuclear power.

Through the Sabatier reaction methane can then be produced which may then be stored to be burned later in power plants (as a synthetic natural gas), transported by pipeline, truck, or tanker ship, or be used in gas to liquids processes such as the Fischer–Tropsch process to make traditional fuels for transportation or heating.

There are a few more fuels that can be created using hydrogen. Formic acid for example can be made by reacting the hydrogen with CO_{2}. Formic acid combined with CO_{2} can form isobutanol.

Methanol can be made from a chemical reaction of a carbon-dioxide molecule with three hydrogen molecules to produce methanol and water. The stored energy can be recovered by burning the methanol in a combustion engine, releasing carbon dioxide, water, and heat. Methane can be produced in a similar reaction. Special precautions against methane leaks are important since methane is nearly 100 times as potent as CO_{2}, regarding the 20-year global warming potential. More energy can be used to combine methanol or methane into larger hydrocarbon fuel molecules.

Researchers have also suggested using methanol to produce dimethyl ether. This fuel could be used as a substitute for diesel fuel due to its ability to self ignite under high pressure and temperature. It is already being used in some areas for heating and energy generation. It is nontoxic, but must be stored under pressure. Larger hydrocarbons and ethanol can also be produced from carbon dioxide and hydrogen.

All synthetic hydrocarbons are generally produced at temperatures of 200–300 °C, and at pressures of 20 to 50 bar. Catalysts are usually used to improve the efficiency of the reaction and create the desired type of hydrocarbon fuel. Such reactions are exothermic and use about 3 mol of hydrogen per mole of carbon dioxide involved. They also produce large amounts of water as a byproduct.

== Sources of carbon for recycling ==
The most economical source of carbon for recycling into fuel is flue-gas emissions from fossil-fuel combustion where it can be obtained for about US$7.50 per ton. However, this is not carbon-neutral, since the carbon is of fossil origin, therefore moving carbon from the geosphere to the atmosphere. Since carbonic acid in seawater is in chemical equilibrium with atmospheric carbon dioxide, extraction of carbon from seawater has been studied. Researchers have estimated that carbon extraction from seawater would cost about $50 per ton. Carbon capture from ambient air is more costly, at between $94 and $232 per ton and is considered impractical for fuel synthesis or carbon sequestration. Direct air capture is less developed than other methods. Proposals for this method involve using a caustic chemical to react with carbon dioxide in the air to produce carbonates. These can then be broken down and hydrated to release pure CO_{2} gas and regenerate the caustic chemical. This process requires more energy than other methods because carbon dioxide is at much lower concentrations in the atmosphere than in other sources.

Researchers have also suggested using biomass as a carbon source for fuel production. Adding hydrogen to the biomass would reduce its carbon to produce fuel. This method has the advantage of using plant matter to cheaply capture carbon dioxide. The plants also add some chemical energy to the fuel from biological molecules. This may be a more efficient use of biomass than conventional biofuel because it uses most of the carbon and chemical energy from the biomass instead of releasing as much energy and carbon. Its main disadvantage is, as with conventional ethanol production, it competes with food production.

== Renewable and nuclear energy costs ==
Nighttime wind power is considered the most economical form of electrical power with which to synthesize fuel, because the load curve for electricity peaks sharply during the warmest hours of the day, but wind tends to blow slightly more at night than during the day. Therefore, the price of nighttime wind power is often much less expensive than any alternative. Off-peak wind power prices in high wind penetration areas of the U.S. averaged 1.64 cents per kilowatt-hour in 2009, but only 0.71 cents/kWh during the least expensive six hours of the day. Typically, wholesale electricity costs 2 to 5 cents/kWh during the day. Commercial fuel synthesis companies suggest they can produce gasoline for less than petroleum fuels when oil costs more than $55 per barrel.

In 2010, a team of process chemists led by Heather Willauer of the U.S. Navy, estimates that 100 megawatts of electricity can produce 160 cubic metres (41,000 US gal) of jet fuel per day and shipboard production from nuclear power would cost about $1,600 per cubic metre ($6/US gal). While that was about twice the petroleum fuel cost in 2010, it is expected to be much less than the market price in less than five years if recent trends continue. Moreover, since the delivery of fuel to a carrier battle group costs about $2,100 per cubic metre ($8/US gal), shipboard production is already much less expensive.

Willauer said seawater is the "best option" for a source of synthetic jet fuel. By April 2014, Willauer's team had not yet made fuel to the standard required by military jets, but they were able in September 2013 to use the fuel to fly a radio-controlled model airplane powered by a common two-stroke internal combustion engine. Because the process requires a large input of electrical energy, a plausible first step of implementation would be for American nuclear-powered aircraft carriers (the Nimitz-class and the Gerald R. Ford-class) to manufacture their own jet fuel. The U.S. Navy is expected to deploy the technology some time in the 2020s.

In 2023, a study published by the NATO Energy Security Centre of Excellence, concluded that e-fuels offer one of the most promising decarbonization pathways for military mobility across the land, sea and air domains.

== Demonstration projects and commercial development ==
A 250 kilowatt methane synthesis plant was constructed by the Center for Solar Energy and Hydrogen Research (ZSW) at Baden-Württemberg and the Fraunhofer Society in Germany and began operating in 2010. It is being upgraded to 10 megawatts, scheduled for completion in autumn 2012.

The George Olah carbon dioxide recycling plant (named after George Andrew Olah) operated by Carbon Recycling International in Grindavík, Iceland, has been producing 2 million liters of methanol transportation fuel per year from flue exhaust of the Svartsengi Power Station since 2011. It has the capacity to produce 5 million liters per year.

Audi has constructed a carbon-neutral liquefied natural gas (LNG) plant in Werlte, Germany. The plant is intended to produce transportation fuel to offset LNG used in their A3 Sportback g-tron automobiles, and can keep 2,800 metric tons of CO_{2} out of the environment per year at its initial capacity.

Zero, a British-based company set up by former F1 engineer Paddy Lowe, has developed a process it terms 'petrosynthesis' to develop synthetic fuels from atmospheric carbon dioxide and water using renewable energy. In 2022 it began work on a demonstration production plant at Bicester Heritage near Oxford.

Commercial developments are taking place in Columbia, South Carolina, Camarillo, California, and Darlington, England. A demonstration project in Berkeley, California, proposes synthesizing both fuels and food oils from recovered flue gases.

== Greenhouse gas remediation ==
Carbon-neutral fuels can lead to greenhouse gas remediation because carbon dioxide gas would be reused to produce fuel instead of being released into the atmosphere. Capturing the carbon dioxide in flue gas emissions from power plants would eliminate their greenhouse gas emissions, although burning the fuel in vehicles would release that carbon because there is no economical way to capture those emissions. This approach would reduce net carbon dioxide emission by about 50% if it were used on all fossil fuel power plants. Most coal and natural gas power plants have been predicted to be economically retrofittable with carbon dioxide scrubbers for carbon capture to recycle flue exhaust or for carbon sequestration. Such recycling is expected to not only cost less than the excess economic impacts of climate change if it were not done, but also to pay for itself as global fuel demand growth and peak oil shortages increase the price of petroleum and fungible natural gas.

Capturing CO_{2} directly from the air, known as direct air capture, or extracting carbonic acid from seawater would also reduce the amount of carbon dioxide in the environment, and create a closed cycle of carbon to eliminate new carbon dioxide emissions. Use of these methods would eliminate the need for fossil fuels entirely, assuming that enough renewable energy could be generated to produce the fuel. Using synthetic hydrocarbons to produce synthetic materials such as plastics could result in permanent sequestration of carbon from the atmosphere.

== Technologies ==
=== Traditional fuels, methanol or ethanol ===
Some authorities have recommended producing methanol instead of traditional transportation fuels. It is a liquid at normal temperatures and can be toxic if ingested. Methanol has a higher octane rating than gasoline but a lower energy density, and can be mixed with other fuels or used on its own. It may also be used in the production of more complex hydrocarbons and polymers. Direct methanol fuel cells have been developed by Caltech's Jet Propulsion Laboratory to convert methanol and oxygen into electricity. It is possible to convert methanol into gasoline, jet fuel or other hydrocarbons, but that requires additional energy and more complex production facilities. Methanol is slightly more corrosive than traditional fuels, requiring automobile modifications on the order of US$100 each to use it.

In 2016, a method using carbon spikes, copper nanoparticles and nitrogen that converts carbon dioxide to ethanol was developed.

=== Microalgae ===
Fuel made from microalgae could potentially have a low carbon footprint and is an active area of research, although no large-scale production system has been commercialized to date. Microalgae are aquatic unicellular organisms. Although they, unlike most plants, have extremely simple cell structures, they are still photoautotrophic, able to use solar energy to convert carbon dioxide into carbohydrates and fats via photosynthesis. These compounds can serve as raw materials for biofuels like bioethanol or biodiesel. Therefore, even though combusting microalgae-based fuel for energy would still produce emissions like any other fuel, it could be close to carbon-neutral if they, as a whole, consumed as much carbon dioxide as is emitted during combustion.

The advantages of microalgae are their higher CO_{2}-fixation efficiency compared to most plants and their ability to thrive in a wide variety of aquatic habitats. Their main disadvantage is their high cost. It has been argued that their unique and highly variable chemical compositions may make it attractive for specific applications.

Microalgae also can be used as livestock feed due to their proteins. Even more, some species of microalgae produce valuable compounds such as pigments and pharmaceuticals.

==== Production ====
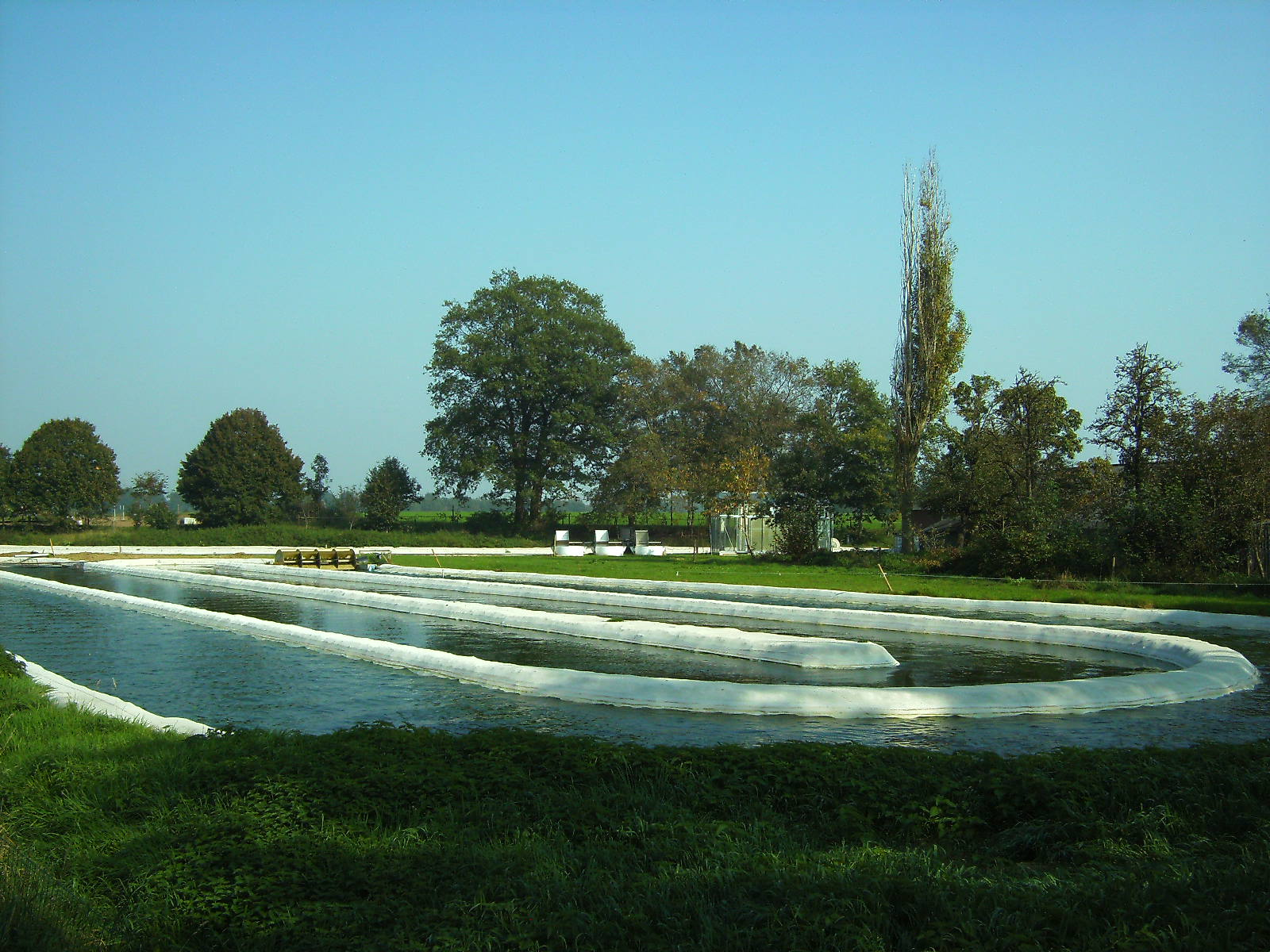
Raceway pond used for the cultivation of microalgae. The water is kept in constant motion with a powered paddle wheel.

Two main ways of cultivating microalgae are raceway pond systems and photo-bioreactors. Raceway pond systems are constructed by a closed loop oval channel that has a paddle wheel to circulate water and prevent sedimentation. The channel is open to the air and its depth is in the range of 0.25–0.4 m (0.82–1.31 ft). The pond needs to be kept shallow since self-shading and optical absorption can cause the limitation of light penetration through the solution of algae broth. PBRs's culture medium is constructed by closed transparent array of tubes. It has a central reservoir which circulated the microalgae broth. PBRs is an easier system to be controlled compare to the raceway pond system, yet it costs a larger overall production expenses.

The carbon emissions from microalgae biomass produced in raceway ponds could be compared to the emissions from conventional biodiesel by having inputs of energy and nutrients as carbon-intensive. The corresponding emissions from microalgae biomass produced in PBRs could also be compared and might even exceed the emissions from conventional fossil diesel. The inefficiency is due to the amount of electricity used to pump the algae broth around the system. Using co-product to generate electricity is one strategy that might improve the overall carbon balance. Another thing that needs to be acknowledged is that environmental impacts can also come from water management, carbon dioxide handling, and nutrient supply, several aspects that could constrain system design and implementation options. But, in general, Raceway Pond systems demonstrate a more attractive energy balance than PBR systems.

==== Economy ====
Production cost of microalgae-biofuel through implementation of raceway pond systems is dominated by the operational cost which includes labour, raw materials, and utilities. In raceway pond system, during the cultivation process, electricity takes up the largest energy fraction of total operational energy requirements. It is used to circulate the microalgae cultures. It takes up an energy fraction ranging from 22% to 79%. In contrast, capital cost dominates the cost of production of microalgae-biofuel in PBRs. This system has a high installation cost though the operational cost is relatively lower than raceway pond systems.

Microalgae-biofuel production costs a larger amount of money compared to fossil fuel production. The cost estimation of producing microalgae-biofuel is around $3.1 per litre ($11.57/US gal), which is considerably more expensive than conventional gasoline. However, when compared with electrification of the vehicle fleet – a key advantage of such biofuel is the avoidance of the costly distribution of large amounts of electrical energy (as is required to convert existing vehicle fleets to battery electric technology), therein allowing for the re-use of the existing liquid-fuel transportation infrastructure. Biofuel such as ethanol is also greatly more energy dense than current battery technologies (approximately 6x as much) further promoting its economic viability.

==== Environmental impact ====
The construction of large-scale microalgae cultivation facilities would inevitably result in negative environmental impacts related to land use change, such as the destruction of existing natural habitats. Microalgae can also under certain conditions emit greenhouse gases, like methane or nitrous oxide, or foul-smelling gases, like hydrogen sulfide, although this has not been widely studied to date. If poorly managed, toxins naturally produced by microalgae may leak into the surrounding soil or ground water.

==== Production ====
Water undergoes electrolysis at high temperatures to form hydrogen gas and oxygen gas. The energy to perform this is extracted from renewable sources such as wind power. Then, the hydrogen is reacted with compressed carbon dioxide captured by direct air capture. The reaction produces blue crude which consists of hydrocarbon. The blue crude is then refined to produce high efficiency E-diesel. This method is, however, still debatable because with the current production capability it can only produce 3,000 liters in a few months, 0.0002% of the daily production of fuel in the US. Furthermore, the thermodynamic and economic feasibility of this technology have been questioned. An article suggests that this technology does not create an alternative to fossil fuel but rather converting renewable energy into liquid fuel. The article also states that the energy return on energy invested using fossil diesel is 18 times higher than that for e-diesel.

== History ==
Investigation of carbon-neutral fuels has been ongoing for decades. A 1965 report suggested synthesizing methanol from carbon dioxide in air using nuclear power for a mobile fuel depot. Shipboard production of synthetic fuel using nuclear power was studied in 1977 and 1995. A 1984 report studied the recovery of carbon dioxide from fossil fuel plants. A 1995 report compared converting vehicle fleets for the use of carbon-neutral methanol with the further synthesis of gasoline.

== See also ==
- Artificial photosynthesis
- Butanol fuel
- Carbon-neutral hydrogen production
- Carbon cycle re-balancing
- Carbon sink
- Climate change mitigation scenarios
- Climate engineering (geoengineering)
- Compressed CO_{2} as a fuel
- Fossil-fuel phase-out
- Hydrogen vehicle
- Fourth generation biofuels
- Low-carbon economy
- Sustainable energy
- Synthetic Liquid Fuels Program
- Electrofuel
