= Power-to-X =

Storing surplus electricity production in chemical form

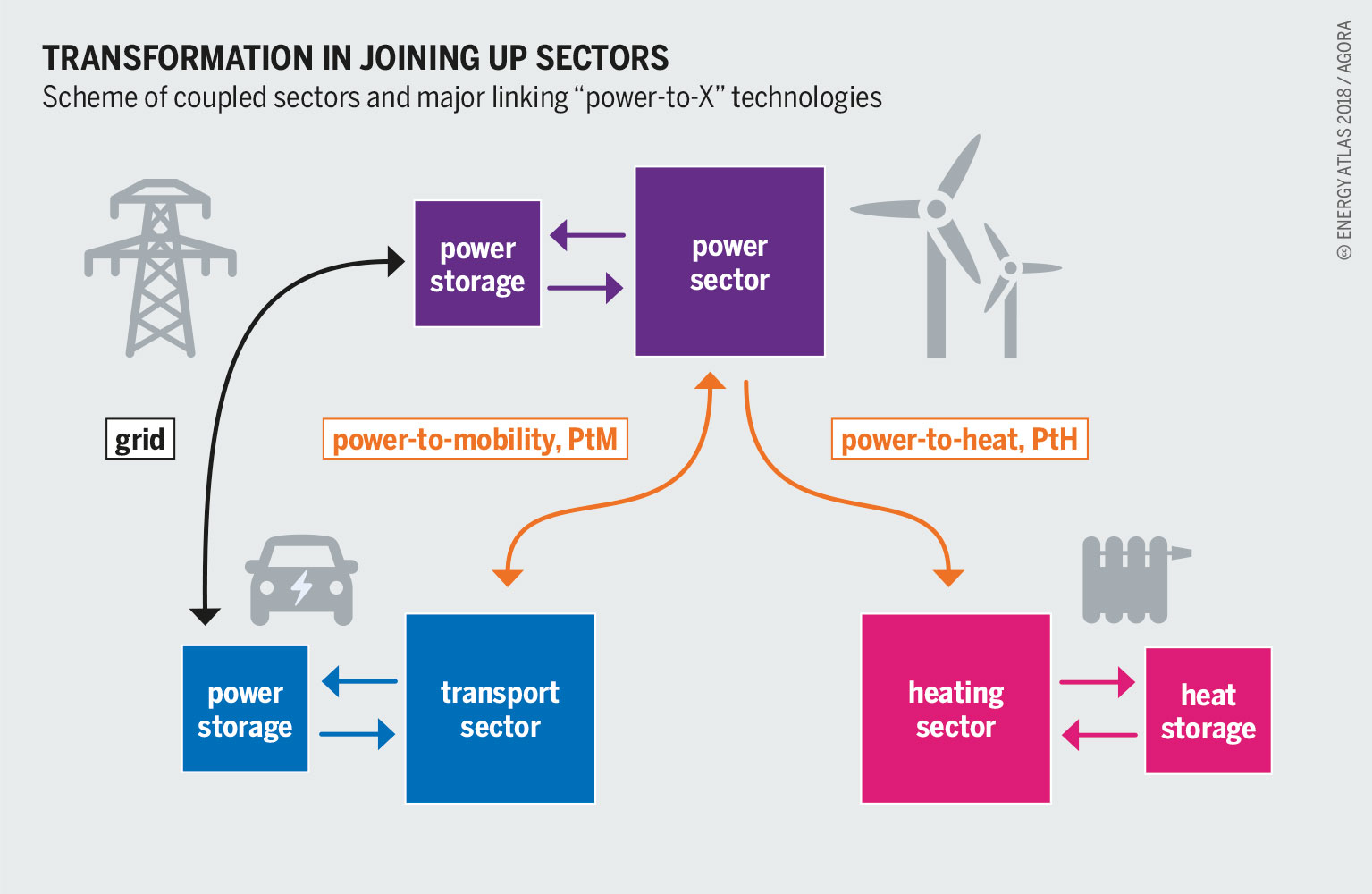
Transformation in joining up sectors

Power-to-X (also P2X and P2Y) are electricity conversion, energy storage, and reconversion pathways from surplus renewable energy. By linking the power sector to other energy sectors, power-to-X conversion technologies offer the possibilities to exploit synergies across the whole energy as intended with the concept of sector coupling and fully integrated smart energy systems.

The X in the terminology can refer to one of the following: power-to-ammonia, power-to-chemicals, power-to-gas (power-to-hydrogen, power-to-methane), power to food, and power-to-heat. Electric vehicle charging, space heating and cooling, and water heating can be shifted in time to match generation. These are forms of demand response that can be considered power-to-mobility and power-to-heat respectively. While power uses such as charging, food creation, heating, and chemical creation can be considered separate, use cases such as power-to-ammonia, and both power-to-gas examples can all be considered examples of electrofuels. These are a class of synthetic fuels that have potential as carbon-neutral fuel if they are created with renewable energy.

Collectively power-to-X schemes which use surplus power fall under the heading of flexibility measures and are particularly useful in energy systems with high shares of renewable generation and/or with strong decarbonization targets. A large number of pathways and technologies are encompassed by the term. In 2016 the German government funded a €30 million first-phase research project into power-to-X options.

== Power-to-fuel ==
Surplus electric power can be converted to gas fuel energy for storage and reconversion. Direct current electrolysis of water (efficiency 80–85% at best) can be used to produce hydrogen which can, in turn, be converted to methane (CH_{4}) via methanation. Another possibility is converting the hydrogen, along with CO_{2} to methanol. Both these fuels can be stored and used to produce electricity again, hours to months later.

=== Storage and reconversion of power-to-fuel ===
Hydrogen and methane can be used as downstream fuels, fed into the natural gas grid, or used to make synthetic fuel. Alternatively they can be used as a chemical feedstock, as can ammonia (NH_{3}).

Reconversion technologies include gas turbines, combined cycle plants, reciprocating engines and fuel cells. Power-to-power refers to the round-trip reconversion efficiency. For hydrogen storage, the round-trip efficiency remains limited at 35–50%. Electrolysis is expensive and power-to-gas processes need substantial full-load hours to be economic. However, while round-trip conversion efficiency of power-to-power is lower than with batteries and electrolysis can be expensive, storage of the fuels themselves is quite inexpensive. This means that large amounts of energy can be stored for long periods of time with power-to-power, which is ideal for seasonal storage. This could be particularly useful for systems with high variable renewable energy penetration, since many areas have significant seasonal variability of solar, wind, and run-of-the-river-hydroelectric generation.

=== Batteries ===
Despite it also being based fundamentally on electrolytic chemical reactions, battery storage is not normally considered a power-to-fuel concept.

== Power-to-heat ==
The purpose of power-to-heat systems is to utilize excess electricity generated by renewable energy sources which would otherwise be wasted. Depending on the context, the power-to-heat can either be stored as heat, or delivered as heat to meet a need.

=== Heating systems ===
In contrast to simple electric heating systems such as night storage heating which covers the complete heating requirements, power-to-heat systems are hybrid systems, which additionally have traditional heating systems using chemical fuels like wood or natural gas. When there is excess energy the heat production can result from electric energy otherwise the traditional heating system will be used. In order to increase flexibility power-to-heat systems are often coupled with heat accumulators. The power supply occurs for the most part in the local and district heating networks. Power-to-heat systems are also able to supply buildings or industrial systems with heat.

Power-to-heat involves contributing to the heat sector, either by resistance heating or via a heat pump. Resistance heaters have unity efficiency, and the corresponding coefficient of performance (COP) of heat pumps is 2–5. Back-up immersion heating of both domestic hot water and district heating offers a cheap way of using surplus renewable energy and will often displace carbon-intensive fossil fuels for the task. Large-scale heat pumps in district heating systems with thermal energy storage are an especially attractive option for power-to-heat: they offer exceptionally high efficiency for balancing excess wind and solar power, and they can be profitable investments.

== Other forms of power-to-X ==
Power-to-mobility refers to the charging of battery electric vehicles (BEV). Given the expected uptake of EVs, dedicated dispatch will be required. As vehicles are idle for most of the time, shifting the charging time can offer considerable flexibility: the charging window is a relatively long 8–12 hours, whereas the charging duration is around 90 minutes. The EV batteries can also be discharged to the grid to make them work as electricity storage devices, but this may cause additional wear to the battery.

== Impact ==
According to the concept of sector coupling interconnecting all the energy-using sectors will require the digitalisation and automation of numerous processes to synchronise supply and demand.

A 2023 study examined to role that power‑to‑X could play in a highly‑renewable future energy system for Japan. The P2X technologies considered include water electrolysis, methanation, Fischer–Tropsch synthesis, and Haber–Bosch synthesis and the study used linear programming to determine least‑cost system structure and operation. Results indicate that these various P2X technologies can effectively shift electricity loads and reduce curtailment by 80% or more.

== See also ==
- Grid energy storage
- Flywheel
- Electrofuel
- Methanol economy
