= ITM Power =

English electrolyser company

- Traded as: LSE: ITM
- ISIN: GB00B0130H42
- Industry: Hydrogen economy
- Founded: 2000
- Headquarters: Sheffield, England
- Key people: Dennis Schulz (CEO); Simon Bourne (CTO); Amy Grey (CFO)
- Products: Electrolysers
- Revenue: £16.5 million (2024)
- Website: www.itm-power.com

ITM Power plc designs, manufactures, and integrates electrolysers based on proton exchange membrane (PEM) technology to produce green hydrogen using renewable electricity and tap water. Hydrogen produced via electrolysis is used for mobility, Power-to-X, and industry.

The company floated on the Alternative Investment Market (AIM) in 2004, becoming the first hydrogen company publicly listed on the London Stock Exchange (LSE). LSE has also granted the company a Green Economy Mark.

ITM Power is headquartered in Sheffield within the world's largest electrolyser factory. It also operates from a further two Sheffield-based sites and an office located in Hesse, Germany.

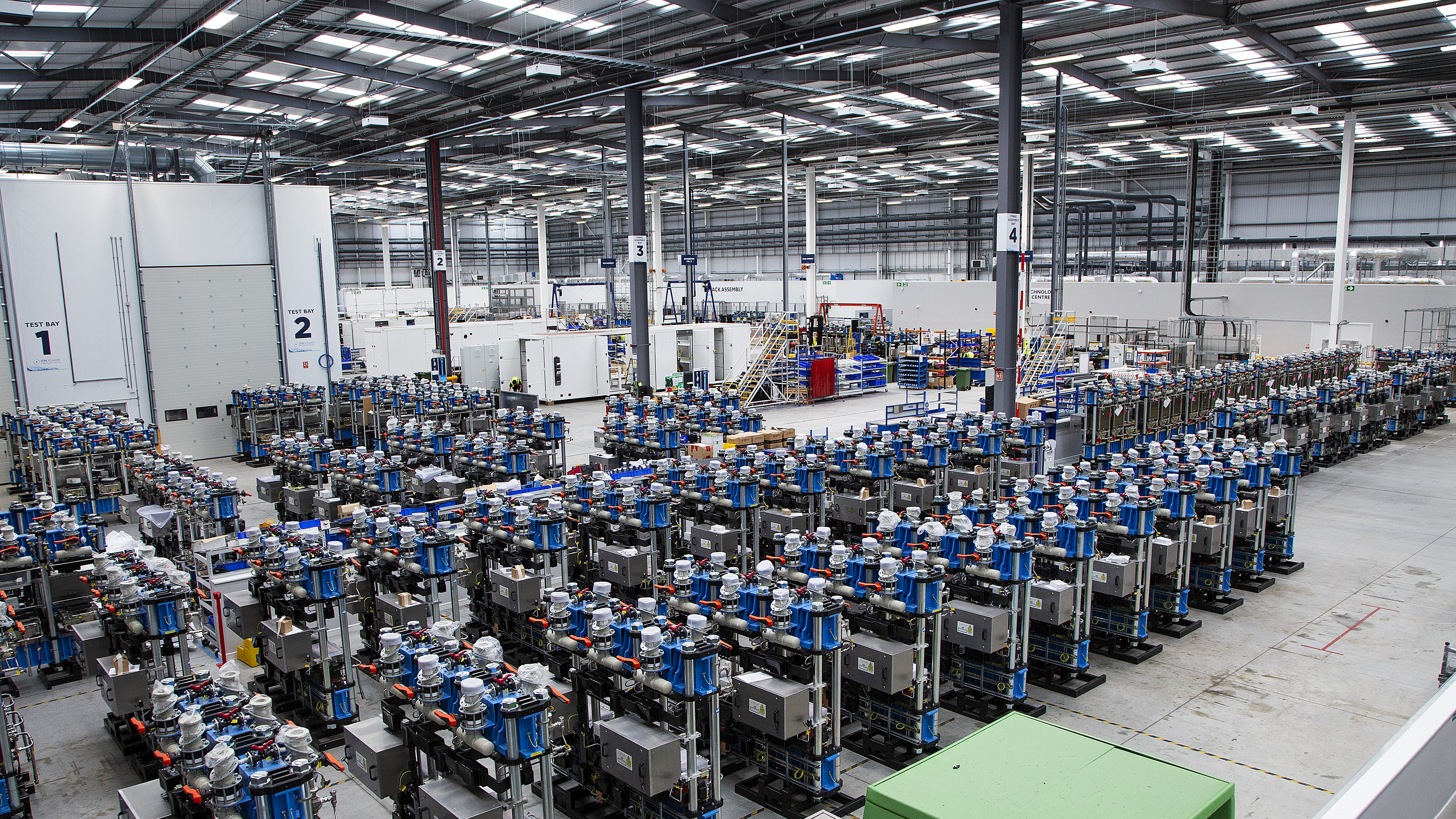
ITM Power TRIDENT stacks in Bessemer Park, Sheffield

== History ==
=== Early years ===
ITM Power was founded in June 2000 in Saffron Walden, Essex and originally manufactured fuel cells before expanding into electrolysers. In 2004, the company floated on the AIM Market raising £10 million.

=== 2010-2020 ===
Its first sale was an electrolyser for the University of Birmingham, UK. In 2011, ITM Power GmbH, the company's German subsidiary, was incorporated.

The company raised £52 million via a second equity fundraise in 2019. This included a strategic investment of £38 million from Linde plc and the establishment of the joint venture, ITM Linde Electrolysis (ILE), to provide green gas solutions at industrial scale. ILE was incorporated in January 2020.

In 2019, ITM signed a collaboration agreement with Iwatani Corporation of America, a wholly owned subsidiary of Japan's Iwatani Corporation, for the deployment of multi megawatt electrolyser-based hydrogen energy systems in North America.

In 2020, ITM enacted a third fundraise, raising £172 million in equity that included a £30 million investment from Snam S.p.A.

=== 2021 ===
In January the company sold a 24 MW PEM electrolyser unit, the largest in the world, to Linde. The unit will be installed at the Leuna Chemical Complex in Germany. Production is due to start in the second half of 2022.

In March the company marked its first deployment in Japan with the sale of a 1.4 MW electrolyser to Sumitomo Corporation.

August marked the official opening of Bessemer Park in Sheffield. The facility has an electrolyser manufacturing capacity of 1 GW per annum, making it the largest in the world to date.

In October the company raised £250 million to expand manufacturing capacity to 5 GW per annum by 2024.

=== 2022 ===
Full-year results revealed that annual pre-tax losses almost doubled to £46.7 million on the back of £5.6 million of revenues. The firm admitted that it has scrapped its 5 GW annual capacity target by 2025, now aiming for 1.5 GW per annum by 2023. It also scrapped its previous decision to open a second UK factory in Sheffield. It also announced that its CEO for 13 years, Graham Cooley, would leave once a successor was appointed. In December, Dennis Schulz, joined as CEO, leaving Linde Engineering, a division of Linde plc.

=== 2023 ===
In January ITM signed two contracts, each for the sale of 100 MW of PEM electrolysers to Linde Engineering. ITM expanded its Bessemer Park facility. Strategic collaborations with Mott Corporation, W. L. Gore & Associates and FRIEMwere announced. POSEIDON, ITM's 20MW electrolyser module was launched. ITM sold Motive Fuels Ltd, the hydrogen transport refulling business to investment group HYCAP In November a Hybrid Stack was launched citing a 10% efficiency improvement. In December the company finalised a capacity reservation agreement with Shell Deutschland. The company announced that future production capacity advanced electrolyser stacks would be secured by Shell under the agreement.

=== 2024 ===
ITM launched NEPTUNE V, a containerised 5 MW electrolyser plant in May, and went on to secure its first contract in November for 15 MW due to go to Gutroff in Germany. In March ITM completed the installation of a 2 MW NEPTUNE electrolyser at Tokyo Gas Co Ltd’s Yokohama Techno Station with Sumitomo Corporation. Hygen appointed ITM as a preferred supplier of PEM electrolysers within the UK and across wider Europe. Yara's 24 MW hydrogen plant at Herøya Industrial Park, which utilises ITM's TRIDENT stack platforms, to produce green ammonia was officially inaugurated in June. The REFHYNE I project concluded in June and followed with an announcement of a 100 MW contract being signed with Shell for REFHYNE II ITM announced the results of research into in Iridium reduction, by validating an additional 40% iridium loading reduction whilst maintaining stack performance and longevity.

=== 2025 ===
In January, Amy Grey joined ITM as Chief Financial Officer. She previously worked at Sheffield Forgemasters.

In February, the company sold four NEPTUNE V units to La Française de l’Energie SA.

In March, ITM signed an agreement with Deutsche Bahn AG to collaborate on sustainable transportation and infrastructure

== Industrial projects ==
ITM Power is currently engaged with industry and academia partners in several projects to deploy its technology and products in existing and emerging markets.

=== Lingen ===
ITM sold two batches of 100 MW of PEM electrolysers to Linde Engineering. Both plants will be installed at a site operated by RWE in Lingen, Germany, and will be powered by offshore wind from the North Sea.

=== Herøya ===
ITM sold 24 MW of TRIDENT stacks to Linde Engineering who installed at a site operated by Yara Norge AS located at Herøya outside Porsgrunn Norway. The Porsgrunn site produces 3 million tons of fertiliser per year. The hydrogen produced by the electrolyser will be used to produce green ammonia.

=== REFHYNE ===
The REFHYNE project aims to supply clean refinery hydrogen for Europe. Comprising a partnership including ITM Power and Shell, it is funded by the European Commission's Fuel Cells and Hydrogen Joint Undertaking (FCH JU).

Following two years of construction, Shell launched Europe's largest hydrogen electrolysis plant at its Rhineland Refinery in Wesseling, Germany. The PEM electrolyser supplied by ITM Power is the largest of its kind to be deployed on a major industrial scale. The project will investigate the feasibility of introducing similar technology in other industry plants.

In October 2020, the REFHYNE II consortium, which aims to install a 100-MW electrolyser at Shell's Energy and Chemicals Park, Rheinland, secured a EUR-32.4-million grant from the European Climate, Infrastructure and Environment Executive Agency.

The project will use 100 megawatts of TRIDENT electrolyser stacks reserved from a capacity reservation agreement with Shell Deutschland, with production tentatively occurring from 2025 to 2026. However, its execution is dependent on a final investment decision.

=== HyDeploy ===
HyDeploy is an energy trial to establish the potential for blending up to 20% zero carbon hydrogen into the normal gas supply to reduce carbon dioxide emissions. It was the first trial of its kind in the UK.

The £7 million project was funded by Ofgem and led by gas network Cadent in partnership with Northern Gas Networks, with ITM Power supplying the electrolyser system. 100 homes and 30 university faculty buildings on a private gas network at Keele University in Staffordshire received the blended gas during the first phase which ended in March 2021.

The trial was designed to determine the level of hydrogen which could be used by gas consumers safely and with no changes to their behaviour or existing domestic appliances. A second phase launched in August 2021 and is due for completion in 2022.

== Hydrogen refuelling stations ==
ITM Power had a hydrogen refuelling business, Motive Fuels Ltd, which it sold to HYCAP Group in 2023.

Historically, ITM installed an electrolyser driven hydrogen refuelling station (HRS) named Hfuel at the University of Nottingham in 2012. The refuelling station can provide hydrogen at 350 bar to vehicles and 150 bar to the university's laboratory.

In September 2015, it opened the HRS at the Advanced Manufacturing Park in Rotherham, Yorkshire.

Another station, located at the National Physical Laboratory in Teddington, London, opened in May 2016. It was the first of three such stations launched under the pan-European HyFive Project, funded by the FCH JU and the UK Government Office of Low Emission Vehicles (OLEV).

The second HyFive station was opened at East London's Centre of Engineering Manufacturing Excellence (CEME) in October 2016. This station uses a solar photovoltaic array to produce renewable hydrogen on-site for public and private fleets operating fuel cell electric vehicles to recharge.

The third and final HRS under the HyFive project was opened in February 2017. Located at the Cobham Motorway Service Area on the M25 motorway, it was the first HRS in the UK to be located on a forecourt and Shell's first in the UK.

In 2020, the company set up the ITM Motive division to manage its HRS assets. In 2021, the division was established as a separate, wholly owned subsidiary, owning and operating a portfolio of 12 publicly accessible HRS assets. It was, before its sale, the largest HRS operator in the UK.

== UKH2Mobility ==
UKH2Mobility is a government and cross-industry programme to make hydrogen powered travel in the UK a reality. Industry signatories to the Memorandum of Understanding are:

- Air Liquide Hydrogen Energy, SA
- Air Products and Chemicals PLC
- Daimler AG
- Hyundai Motor Company
- Intelligent Energy Limited
- ITM Power
- Johnson Matthey PLC
- Nissan Motor Manufacturing (UK) Limited
- Scottish and Southern Energy plc
- Tata Motors European Technical Centre plc
- The BOC Group Limited
- Toyota Motor Corporation
- Vauxhall Motors

== Ecoisland Partnership CIC ==
In July 2012, ITM Power, along with four other companies, was selected by the Technology Strategy Board (now Innovate UK) innovation agency and the Department of Energy and Climate Change in the United Kingdom to develop ways of using clean energy on transport systems. ITM's assigned project was to build an electrolysis based hydrogen refueller to be used as transport fuel on the Isle of Wight. The plan is to make the Isle of Wight carbon neutral, by having residents create fuel at their home.
