= Swinging Hannover =

Jazz Festival in Hannover, Germany

Swinging Hannover, since 2005 enercity swinging hannover, is a jazz festival in Germany that lasts for 2 days every year.

== History ==
The festival was founded 1967 by Michael Gehrke as the founder of ″Jazz Club Hannover″. The first place where the open-air festival was organized was the ″Opernplatz″. In 1971 the event location of the open-air part of the festival changed to the ″Trammplatz" in front of the New Town Hall in Hannover. The event takes place every morning at Ascension of Jesus. The second part of the festival, the ″Jazzbandball″, is located in the ″Hannover Congress Centrum″ every evening before Ascension of Jesus. There are about seven bands a year playing at the festival.

The name of the festival changed 2005 after the ″Jazz Club Hannover e. V.″ initiated a partnership with ″Stadtwerke Hannover″ (local public energy company). The Stadtwerke Hannover are also called as enercity and put that term into the name of the festival.

== Reception ==
Many international and national stars of jazz scene were performing at the festival since the beginning in 1967. A bigger prominence was created by introducing the ″Drum-Battles″ where international drummers takes place in a competition, for example Al Foster, Pete York and Charly Antolini.

The open-air concert was recorded until 2000 by German public radio and television broadcaster Norddeutscher Rundfunk. The festival had about 35,000 visitors in 2016 and is one of the biggest jazz festivals in Germany.
