= N-ERGIE =

N-ERGIE AG
- Company type: Public (Aktiengesellschaft)
- Industry: Utility
- Predecessor: Fränkisches Überlandwerk
- Founded: 30 March 2000
- Headquarters: Nuremberg, Germany
- Key people: Josef Hasler (Chairman); Karl-Heinz Pöverlein; Thomas Unnerstall; Marcus König (Chairman of the supervisory board)
- Revenue: €2.87 billion (31/12/2013)
- Number of employees: 2,534 (31/12/2013)
- Website: n-ergie.de

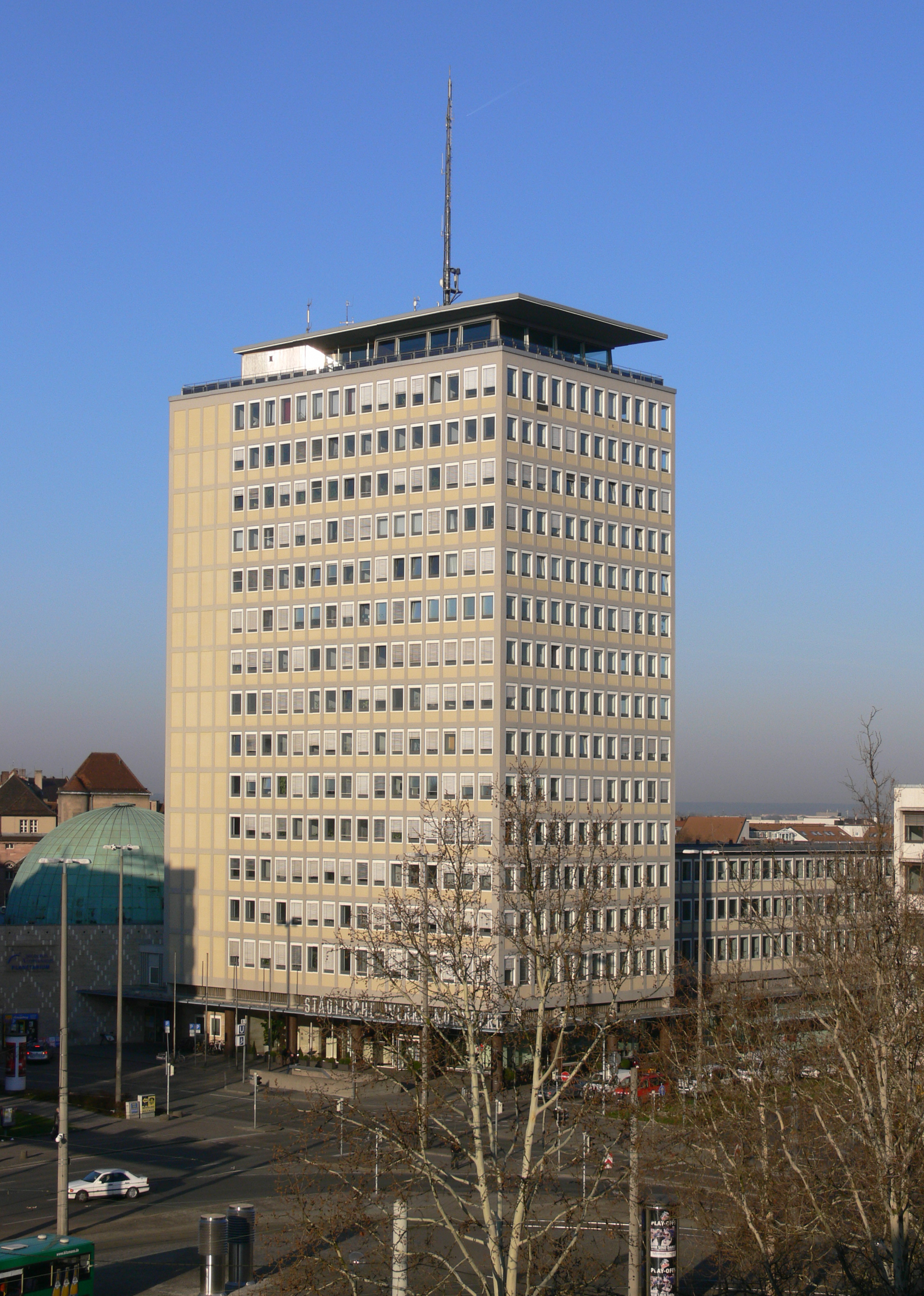
N-ERGIE Headquarters in Nuremberg

N-ERGIE is an energy company with headquarters in Nuremberg.

== History ==
In 1882, Nuremberg became the first city in Germany to have permanent electric street lighting, pioneering a development that would fundamentally change cities and later rural areas as well. N-ERGIE, along with its predecessor companies, is considered one of the pioneers of electricity supply in Franconia.

In March 2000, EWAG Energie und Wasserversorgung AG, Fränkische Überlandwerk AG (FÜW), and MEG Mittelfränkische Erdgas GmbH merged to form N-ERGIE Aktiengesellschaft. Städtische Werke Nürnberg GmbH (StWN) holds a 60.2 percent stake and Thüga Aktiengesellschaft a 39.8 percent stake.
