= Sabatier reaction =

Methanation process of carbon dioxide with hydrogen

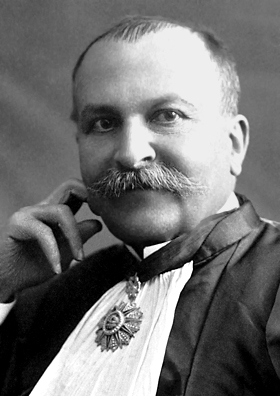
Paul Sabatier (1854–1941), winner of the Nobel Prize in Chemistry in 1912 and discoverer of the reaction in 1897

The Sabatier reaction or Sabatier process produces methane and water from a reaction of hydrogen with carbon dioxide at elevated temperatures (optimally 300–400 °C) and pressures (perhaps 3 megapascals; 440 psi; 30 bar) in the presence of a nickel catalyst. It was discovered by the French chemists Paul Sabatier and Jean-Baptiste Senderens in 1897. Optionally, ruthenium on alumina (aluminium oxide) makes a more efficient catalyst. It is described by the following exothermic reaction:

$\ce{CO2{} + 4H2 ->[400\ ^\circ\ce{C}][\ce{pressure+catalyst}] CH4{} + 2H2O}$ ∆H = −165.0 kJ/mol

There is disagreement on whether the CO_{2} methanation occurs by first associatively adsorbing an adatom hydrogen and forming oxygen intermediates before hydrogenation or dissociating and forming a carbonyl before being hydrogenated.

$\ce{{CO} + 3H2 -> {CH4} + H2O}$ ∆H = −206 kJ/mol

CO methanation is believed to occur through a dissociative mechanism where the carbon oxygen bond is broken before hydrogenation with an associative mechanism only being observed at high H_{2} concentrations.

Methanation reactions over different metal catalysts including Ni, Ru and Rh have been widely investigated for the production of CH_{4} from syngas and other power to gas initiatives. Nickel is the most widely used catalyst owing to its high selectivity and low cost.

== Applications ==
=== Creation of synthetic natural gas ===
Methanation is an important step in the creation of synthetic or substitute natural gas (SNG). Coal or wood undergo gasification which creates a producer gas that must undergo methaneation in order to produce a usable gas that just needs to undergo a final purification step.

The first commercial synthetic gas plant opened in 1984 and is the Great Plains Synfuels plant in Beulah, North Dakota. As of 2016, it is still operational and produces 1500 MW worth of SNG using coal as the carbon source. In the years since its opening, other commercial facilities have been opened using other carbon sources such as wood chips.

In France, AFUL Chantrerie, located in Nantes, in November 2017 opened the demonstrator MINERVE. The plant feeds a compressed natural gas station and sometimes injects methane into a natural gas fired boiler.

The Sabatier reaction has been used in renewable-energy-dominated energy systems to use the excess electricity generated by wind, solar photovoltaic, hydro, marine current, etc. to make methane from hydrogen sourced from water electrolysis. In contrast to a direct usage of hydrogen for transport or energy storage applications, the methane can be injected into the existing gas network. The methane can be used on-demand to generate electricity overcoming low points of renewable energy production. The process is electrolysis of water by electricity to create hydrogen (which can partly be used directly in fuel cells) and the addition of carbon dioxide CO_{2} (Sabatier reaction) to create methane. The CO_{2} can be extracted from the air or fossil fuel waste gases by the amine process.

A 6 MW power-to-gas plant went into production in Germany in 2013, and powered a fleet of 1,500 Audi A3.

=== Ammonia synthesis ===
In ammonia production CO and CO_{2} are considered poisons to most commonly used catalysts. Methanation catalysts are added after several hydrogen producing steps to prevent carbon oxide buildup in the ammonia synthesis loop as methane does not have similar adverse effects on ammonia synthesis rates.

=== International Space Station life support ===
Oxygen generators on board the International Space Station produce oxygen from water using electrolysis; the hydrogen produced was previously discarded into space. As astronauts consume oxygen, carbon dioxide is produced, which must then be removed from the air and discarded as well. This approach required copious amounts of water to be regularly transported to the space station for oxygen generation in addition to that used for human consumption, hygiene, and other uses—a luxury that will not be available to future long-duration missions beyond low Earth orbit.

NASA is using the Sabatier reaction to recover water from exhaled carbon dioxide and the hydrogen previously discarded from electrolysis on the International Space Station and possibly for future missions. The other resulting chemical, methane, is released into space. As half of the input hydrogen becomes wasted as methane, additional hydrogen is supplied from Earth to make up the difference. However, this creates a nearly-closed cycle between water, oxygen, and carbon dioxide which only requires a relatively modest amount of imported hydrogen to maintain.

$$\ce{2H2O ->[\text{electrolysis}] O2{} + 2H2 ->[\text{respiration}] CO2{} + 2H2{} + \overset{added}{2H2} -> 2H2O{} + \overset{discarded}{CH4}}$$

The loop could be further closed if the waste methane was separated into its component parts by pyrolysis, the high efficiency (up to 95%) conversion of which can be achieved at 1200 °C:

$$\ce{CH4 ->[\text{heat}] C{} + 2H2}$$

The released hydrogen would then be recycled back into the Sabatier reactor, leaving an easily removed deposit of pyrolytic graphite. The reactor would be little more than a steel pipe, and could be periodically serviced by an astronaut where the deposit is chiselled out.

Alternatively, the loop could be partially closed (75% of H_{2} from CH_{4} recovered) by incomplete pyrolysis of the waste methane while keeping the carbon locked up in gaseous form as acetylene:

$$\ce{2CH4 ->[\text{heat}] C2H2{} + 3H2}$$

The Bosch reaction is also being investigated by NASA for this purpose, which is:

$$\ce{CO2 + 2H2 -> C + 2H2O}$$

The Bosch reaction would present a completely closed hydrogen and oxygen cycle which only produces atomic carbon as waste. However, difficulties maintaining its temperature of up to 600 °C and properly handling carbon deposits mean significantly more research will be required before a Bosch reactor could become a reality. One problem is that the production of elemental carbon tends to foul the catalyst's surface (coking), which is detrimental to the reaction's efficiency.

=== Manufacturing propellant on Mars ===
The Sabatier reaction has been proposed as a key step in reducing the cost of human mission to Mars (Mars Direct, SpaceX Starship) through in situ resource utilization. Hydrogen is combined with CO_{2} from the atmosphere, with methane then stored as fuel and the water side product electrolyzed yielding oxygen to be liquefied and stored as oxidizer and hydrogen to be recycled back into the reactor. The original hydrogen could be transported from Earth or separated from Martian sources of water.

==== Importing hydrogen ====
Importing a small amount of hydrogen avoids searching for water and just uses CO_{2} from the atmosphere.

"A variation of the basic Sabatier methanation reaction may be used via a mixed catalyst bed and a reverse water gas shift in a single reactor to produce methane from the raw materials available on Mars, utilising carbon dioxide in the Martian atmosphere. A 2011 prototype test operation that harvested CO_{2} from a simulated Martian atmosphere and reacted it with H_{2}, produced methane rocket propellant at a rate of 1 kg/day, operating autonomously for 5 consecutive days, maintaining a nearly 100% conversion rate. An optimised system of this design massing 50 kg "is projected to produce 1 kg/day of O_{2}:CH_{4} propellant ... with a methane purity of 98+% while consuming ~17 kWh per day of electrical power (at a continuous power of 700 W). Overall unit conversion rate expected from the optimised system is one tonne of propellant per 17 MWh energy input."

===== Stoichiometry issue with importing hydrogen =====
The stoichiometric ratio of oxidiser and fuel is 2:1, for an oxygen/methane engine:

$$\ce{CH4 + 2O2 -> CO2 + 2H2O}$$

However, one pass through the Sabatier reactor produces a ratio of only 1:1. More oxygen may be produced by running the water-gas shift reaction (WGSR) in reverse (RWGS), effectively extracting oxygen from the atmosphere by reducing carbon dioxide to carbon monoxide.

Another option is to make more methane than needed and pyrolyze the excess of it into carbon and hydrogen (see above section), where the hydrogen is recycled back into the reactor to produce further methane and water. In an automated system, the carbon deposit may be removed by blasting with hot Martian CO_{2}, oxidizing the carbon into carbon monoxide (via the Boudouard reaction), which is vented.

A fourth solution to the stoichiometry problem would be to combine the Sabatier reaction with the reverse water-gas shift (RWGS) reaction in a single reactor as follows:

$$\ce{3CO2 + 6H2 -> CH4 + 2CO + 4H2O}$$

This reaction is slightly exothermic, and when the water is electrolyzed, an oxygen to methane ratio of 2:1 is obtained.

Regardless of which method of oxygen fixation is utilized, the overall process can be summarized by the following equation:

$$\ce{2H2 + 3CO2 -> CH4 + 2O2 + 2CO}$$

Looking at molecular masses, 16 grams of methane and 64 grams of oxygen have been produced using 4 grams of hydrogen (which would have to be imported from Earth, unless Martian water was electrolysed), for a mass gain of 20:1; and the methane and oxygen are in the right stoichiometric ratio to be burned in a rocket engine. This kind of in situ resource utilization would result in massive weight and cost savings to any proposed crewed Mars or sample-return missions.

== See also ==
- In situ resource utilization – Astronautical use of materials harvested in outer space
- Microlith (catalytic reactor) – Brand of catalytic reactor
- Timeline of hydrogen technologies
- Steam reforming – Method for producing hydrogen and carbon monoxide from hydrocarbon fuels
- Methane pyrolysis (for Hydrogen)
- Fischer–Tropsch process – Chemical reactions that convert carbon monoxide and hydrogen into liquid hydrocarbons
- Electromethanogenesis
- Electrochemical reduction of carbon dioxide
- Haber process – Industrial process for ammonia production
