= Roundtrip efficiency =

Measure of energy loss in storage systems

Roundtrip efficiency is a key performance metric for an energy storage system (ESS) that characterizes the energy lost during a full charge–discharge cycle. It is defined as the ratio of the energy output from the system during discharge to the energy input supplied during charging. A higher round-trip efficiency indicates lower energy losses and operational costs.

The efficiency can be expressed as a percentage using the formula:

$${\text{Roundtrip Efficiency}(\%)} = \frac{\text{Energy Out}}{\text{Energy In}} \times 100$$

Round-trip efficiency greatly affects the economics of energy storage systems, particularly for applications in grid stability, renewable energy integration, and peak demand management.

== Factors affecting efficiency ==
The round-trip efficiency of a storage system accounts for losses from multiple sources. These can include:

- Conversion inefficiencies
- Heat dissipation

For the green hydrogen and green ammonia the main factors are:

- water electrolysis voltage required for production of hydrogen (the energy required for ammonia synthesis is relatively small). The hydrogen production energy linearly depends on the required voltage (that in turn depends on the catalyst used in anode and cathode);
- efficiency of the power plant that burns the fuel (combined cycle gas turbine provides the highest efficiency of 64% assumed for high-end estimates).

== Comparison of storage methods ==
Different energy storage technologies exhibit a wide range of round-trip efficiencies. The technology is often selected based on its intended application, such as providing power quality and distributed power or serving as bulk energy storage.

Comparison of Round-trip Efficiency for Energy Storage Methods
Storage Technology	Median Efficiency (%)	Efficiency Range (%)
Lead-acid battery	~75%	~60% – 90%
Li-ion battery	~90%	~85% – 95%
Sodium–sulfur battery		~60% – 90%
Flywheel	~92%	~85% – 95%
Supercapacitor		85% – 95%
Superconductive	~90%	~85% – 97%
Compressed air	~52%	~41% – 90%
Thermal	~40%	~30% – 50%
Pumped hydro	~75%	~65% – 85%
Redox flow		60% – 75%
Green hydrogen	~40%	28 – 52%
Green ammonia		23 – 42%

== See also ==
- Energy conversion efficiency
- Faraday efficiency
