= Mainova =

German regional energy company

Mainova AG
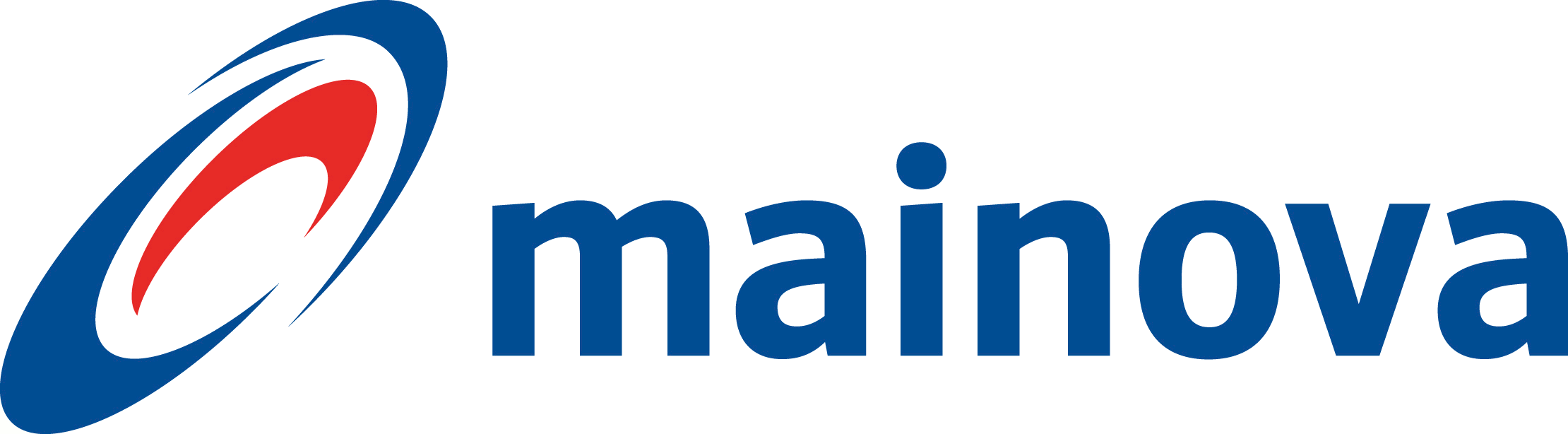
- Company type: Public (Aktiengesellschaft)
- Traded as: FWB: MNV
- Industry: Utility
- Predecessor: Stadtwerke Frankfurt am Main GmbH; Maingas AG
- Founded: 1 January 1998
- Headquarters: Frankfurt, Germany
- Key people: Constantin Alsheimer (CEO); Peter Feldmann (Chairman)
- Products: Electric power Natural gas Water,
- Services: Electric power distribution District heating
- Revenue: €2.05 billion
- Owner: Frankfurt; Thüga
- Number of employees: 2,698
- Website: www.mainova.de

Mainova AG (FWB: MNV6) is one of the largest regional energy suppliers in Germany and supplies about one million people in Hessen and neighboring provinces with electricity, gas, heat and water. It is based in Frankfurt am Main, where the company sponsor the Frankfurt Marathon every year, since 2016.

== History ==
Mainova AG was formed in 1998 through the merger of Stadtwerke Frankfurt am Main GmbH and Maingas AG.

== Corporate structure ==
The energy and water utility has approximately 2,900 employees and posted 2009 sales of €1.66 billion. The largest shareholder of Mainova are the government of Frankfurt am Main with a 75.2% ownership stake of shares and Thüga AG with 24.4% of the shares. The remaining shares (0.4%) are freely floated. The board members are Dr. Constantin Alsheimer (CEO), Norbert Breidenbach, Dr. Peter Birkner and Lothar Herbst. The Chairman of Mainova is city treasurer Uwe Becker.

== Gallery ==
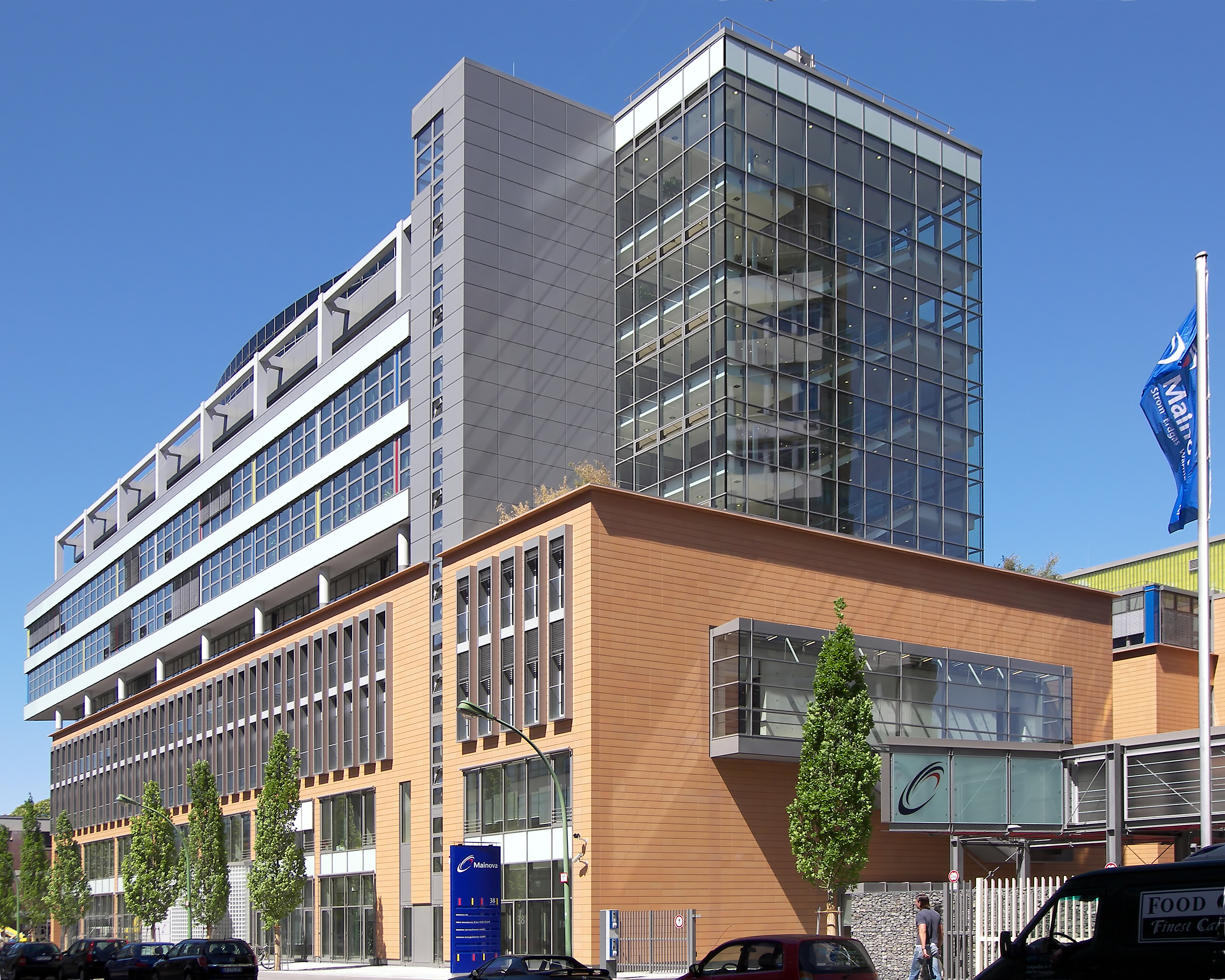
Mainova headquarters in Frankfurt
