= Jecker =

Jecker is a surname. Notable persons with the surname include:

- François-Antoine Jecker (1765-1834), French scientific-instrument maker;
- Jean Baptiste Jecker (1812–1871), Swiss and French banker in Mexico;
- Louis-Joseph Jecker (1801–1851), Swiss and French chemist who established the Jecker Prize.
