= Favre =

Favre is a French surname. Notable people with the surname include:

- Alphonse Favre (1815–1890), Swiss geologist
- Antoine Favre (composer) (c. 1670–c. 1739), French composer and violinist
- Antoine Favre (jurist) (1557–1624) French nobleman and jurist
- Brett Favre (born 1969), U.S. football player (NFL); husband of Deanna Favre
- Claude Favre de Vaugelas (1585–1650), French grammarian
- Corinne Favre (born 1970), French ski instructor and competitive ski mountaineer
- Cristina Favre-Moretti (born 1963), Swiss ski mountaineer
- Danielle Favre, the French student in Mind Your Language
- Deanna Favre (born 1968), U.S. breast cancer activist; wife of Brett Favre
- Émilie Favre (born 1992), French ski mountaineer
- Gilbert Favre (1936–1998), Bolivian flautist
- Jules Favre (1809–1880), French statesman
- Jules Favre (naturalist) (1882–1959), Swiss naturalist
- Julie Favre (1833–1896), French philosopher and educator
- Louis Favre (disambiguation), multiple people
- Lucien Favre (born 1957), Swiss footballer and manager
- Luis Favre, pen name of Felipe Belisario Wermus (born 1949), Brazilian journalist and political activist
- Philippe Favre (1961–2013), Swiss racing driver
- St. Pierre Favre, known as "Peter Faber" (1506–1546), co-founder of the Society of Jesus
- Pierre Favre (musician) (born 1937), Swiss jazz drummer
- Pierre Antoine Favre (1813–1880), French chemist
- Romain Favre (born 2005), French racing driver
- Sandrine Favre (born 1988), French ski mountaineer
- Simon Favre (1760–1813), U.S. interpreter of Muskogean languages; ancestor of Brett Favre
- Valentin Favre (born 1987), French ski mountaineer
