= Roberto Duarte =

Roberto Duarte may refer to:

- Roberto Duarte (conductor)
- Roberto Duarte (politician)

== See also ==
- Roberto Duarte Silva, Cape Verdean chemist
