= Polymer science =

Subfield of materials science concerned with polymers

Polymer science or macromolecular science is a subfield of chemistry and materials science concerned with polymers, primarily synthetic polymers such as plastics and elastomers. The field of polymer science includes researchers in multiple disciplines including chemistry, physics, and engineering.

== Subdisciplines ==
This science comprises three main sub-disciplines:

- Polymer chemistry or macromolecular chemistry is concerned with the chemical synthesis and chemical properties of polymers.
- Polymer physics is concerned with the physical properties of polymer materials and engineering applications. Specifically, it seeks to present the mechanical, thermal, electronic and optical properties of polymers with respect to the underlying physics governing a polymer microstructure. Despite originating as an application of statistical physics to chain structures, polymer physics has now evolved into a discipline in its own right.
- Polymer characterization is concerned with the analysis of chemical structure, morphology, and the determination of physical properties in relation to compositional and structural parameters.

== History of polymer science ==
The first modern example of polymer science is Henri Braconnot's work in the 1830s. Henri, along with Christian Schönbein and others, developed derivatives of the natural polymer cellulose, producing new, semi-synthetic materials, such as celluloid and cellulose acetate. The term "polymer" was coined in 1833 by Jöns Jakob Berzelius, though Berzelius did little that would be considered polymer science in the modern sense. In the 1840s, Friedrich Ludersdorf and Nathaniel Hayward independently discovered that adding sulfur to raw natural rubber (polyisoprene) helped prevent the material from becoming sticky. In 1844 Charles Goodyear received a U.S. patent for vulcanizing natural rubber with sulfur and heat. Thomas Hancock had received a patent for the same process in the UK the year before. This process strengthened natural rubber and prevented it from melting with heat without losing flexibility. This made practical products such as waterproofed articles possible. It also facilitated practical manufacture of such rubberized materials. Vulcanized rubber represents the first commercially successful product of polymer research. In 1884 Hilaire de Chardonnet started the first artificial fiber plant based on regenerated cellulose, or viscose rayon, as a substitute for silk, but it was very flammable. In 1907 Leo Baekeland invented the first synthetic plastic, a thermosetting phenol–formaldehyde resin called Bakelite.

Despite significant advances in polymer synthesis, the molecular nature of polymers was not understood until the work of Hermann Staudinger in 1922. Prior to Staudinger's work, polymers were understood in terms of the association theory or aggregate theory, which originated with Thomas Graham in 1861. Graham proposed that cellulose and other polymers were colloids, aggregates of molecules having small molecular mass connected by an unknown intermolecular force. Hermann Staudinger was the first to propose that polymers consisted of long chains of atoms held together by covalent bonds. It took over a decade for Staudinger's work to gain wide acceptance in the scientific community, work for which he was awarded the Nobel Prize in 1953.

The World War II era marked the emergence of a strong commercial polymer industry. The limited or restricted supply of natural materials such as silk and rubber necessitated the increased production of synthetic substitutes, such as nylon and synthetic rubber. In the intervening years, the development of advanced polymers such as Kevlar and Teflon have continued to fuel a strong and growing polymer industry.

The growth in industrial applications was mirrored by the establishment of strong academic programs and research institutes. In 1946, Herman Mark established the Polymer Research Institute at Brooklyn Polytechnic, the first research facility in the United States dedicated to polymer research. Mark is also recognized as a pioneer in establishing curriculum and pedagogy for the field of polymer science. In 1950, the POLY division of the American Chemical Society was formed, and has since grown to the second-largest division in this association with nearly 8,000 members. Fred W. Billmeyer, Jr., a Professor of Analytical Chemistry had once said that "although the scarcity of education in polymer science is slowly diminishing but it is still evident in many areas. What is most unfortunate is that it appears to exist, not because of a lack of awareness but, rather, a lack of interest."

== Nobel prizes related to polymer science ==
2005 (Chemistry) Robert Grubbs, Richard Schrock, Yves Chauvin for olefin metathesis.

2002 (Chemistry) John Bennett Fenn, Koichi Tanaka, and Kurt Wüthrich for the development of methods for identification and structure analyses of biological macromolecules.

2000 (Chemistry) Alan G. MacDiarmid, Alan J. Heeger, and Hideki Shirakawa for work on conductive polymers, contributing to the advent of molecular electronics.

1991 (Physics) Pierre-Gilles de Gennes for developing a generalized theory of phase transitions with particular applications to describing ordering and phase transitions in polymers.

1974 (Chemistry) Paul J. Flory for contributions to theoretical polymer chemistry.

1963 (Chemistry) Giulio Natta and Karl Ziegler for contributions in polymer synthesis. (Ziegler-Natta catalysis).

1953 (Chemistry) Hermann Staudinger for contributions to the understanding of macromolecular chemistry.
