= Paul Sabatier (chemist) =

French chemist (1854–1941)

Paul Sabatier FRS(For) HFRSE
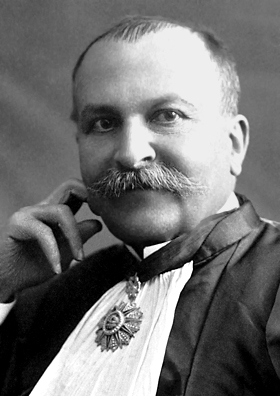
- Sabatier in 1912
- Born: 5 November 1854; Carcassonne, France
- Died: 14 August 1941 (aged 86); Toulouse, France
- Education: Collège de France; École Normale Supérieure
- Known for: Heterogeneous catalysis
- Awards: Nobel Prize for Chemistry (1912); Davy Medal (1915); Albert Medal (1926); Franklin Medal (1933)
- Scientific career
- Fields: Inorganic chemistry
- Workplaces: Collège de France; University of Bordeaux; University of Toulouse
- Doctoral advisor: Marcellin Berthelot

Paul Sabatier (French: [sabatje]; 5 November 1854 – 14 August 1941) was a French chemist, born in Carcassonne. In 1912, Sabatier was awarded the Nobel Prize in Chemistry along with Victor Grignard. Sabatier was honoured for his work improving the hydrogenation of organic species in the presence of metals.

== Education ==
Sabatier studied at the École Normale Supérieure, starting in 1874. Three years later, he graduated at the top of his class. In 1880, he was awarded a Doctor of Science degree from the College de France.

In 1883 Sabatier succeeded Édouard Filhol at the Faculty of Science, and began a long collaboration with Jean-Baptiste Senderens, so close that it was impossible to distinguish the work of either man. They jointly published 34 notes in the Accounts of the Academy of Science, 11 memoirs in the Bulletin of the French Chemical Society and 2 joint memoirs to the Annals of Chemistry and Physics.

After the discovery of nickel tetracarbonyl in 1890 they tried to synthesize similar compound with nitrogen oxides, but only discovered different types of oxidation. As late as 1912, Sabatier believed that it's possible to get "true nitro metals" with dinitrogen tetroxide, but it was later proven that these were not real chemical compounds but just metal oxides with nitrogen dioxide physically absorbed on them.

In 1896 Henri Moissan and Charles Moureu discovered that acetylene reacts with some transition metals. Bearing in mind Prosper de Wilde (1835-1916) hydrogenated acetylene on platinum black in 1874, Sabatier and Senderens picked up the topic and continued investigations in the area.

The methanation reactions of COx were first discovered by Sabatier and Senderens in 1902. Sabatier and Senderen shared the Academy of Science's Jecker Prize in 1905 for their discovery of the Sabatier–Senderens Process.

After 1905–06 Senderens and Sabatier published few joint works, perhaps due to the classic problem of recognition of the merit of contributions to joint work. Sabatier taught science classes most of his life before he became Dean of the Faculty of Science at the University of Toulouse in 1905.

== Research ==
Sabatier's earliest research concerned the thermochemistry of sulfur and metallic sulfates, the subject for the thesis leading to his doctorate. In Toulouse, he continued his physical and chemical investigations to sulfides, chlorides, chromates and copper compounds. He also studied the oxides of nitrogen and nitrosodisulfonic acid and its salts and carried out fundamental research on partition coefficients and absorption spectra. Sabatier greatly facilitated the industrial use of hydrogenation. In 1897, building on the recent biochemical work of the American chemist, James F. Boyce, he discovered that the introduction of a trace amount of nickel (as a catalyst) facilitated the addition of hydrogen to molecules of most carbon compounds.

=== Sabatier reaction ===
Sabatier is best known for the Sabatier process and his works such as La Catalyse en Chimie Organique (Catalysis in organic chemistry) which was published in 1913. He won the Nobel Prize in Chemistry jointly with fellow Frenchman Victor Grignard in 1912.

The reduction of carbon dioxide using hydrogen at high temperature and pressure is another use of nickel catalyst to produce methane.

$$\begin{matrix}{}\\
\ce{{CO2} + 4H2 ->[Catalyst + 400\ ^\circ \ce{C}][\ce{pressure}] {CH4} + 2H2O}\\{}
\end{matrix}$$
∆H = −165.0 kJ/mol
(some initial energy/heat is required to start the reaction)

=== Sabatier principle ===
He is also known for the Sabatier principle of catalysis.

== Personal life ==
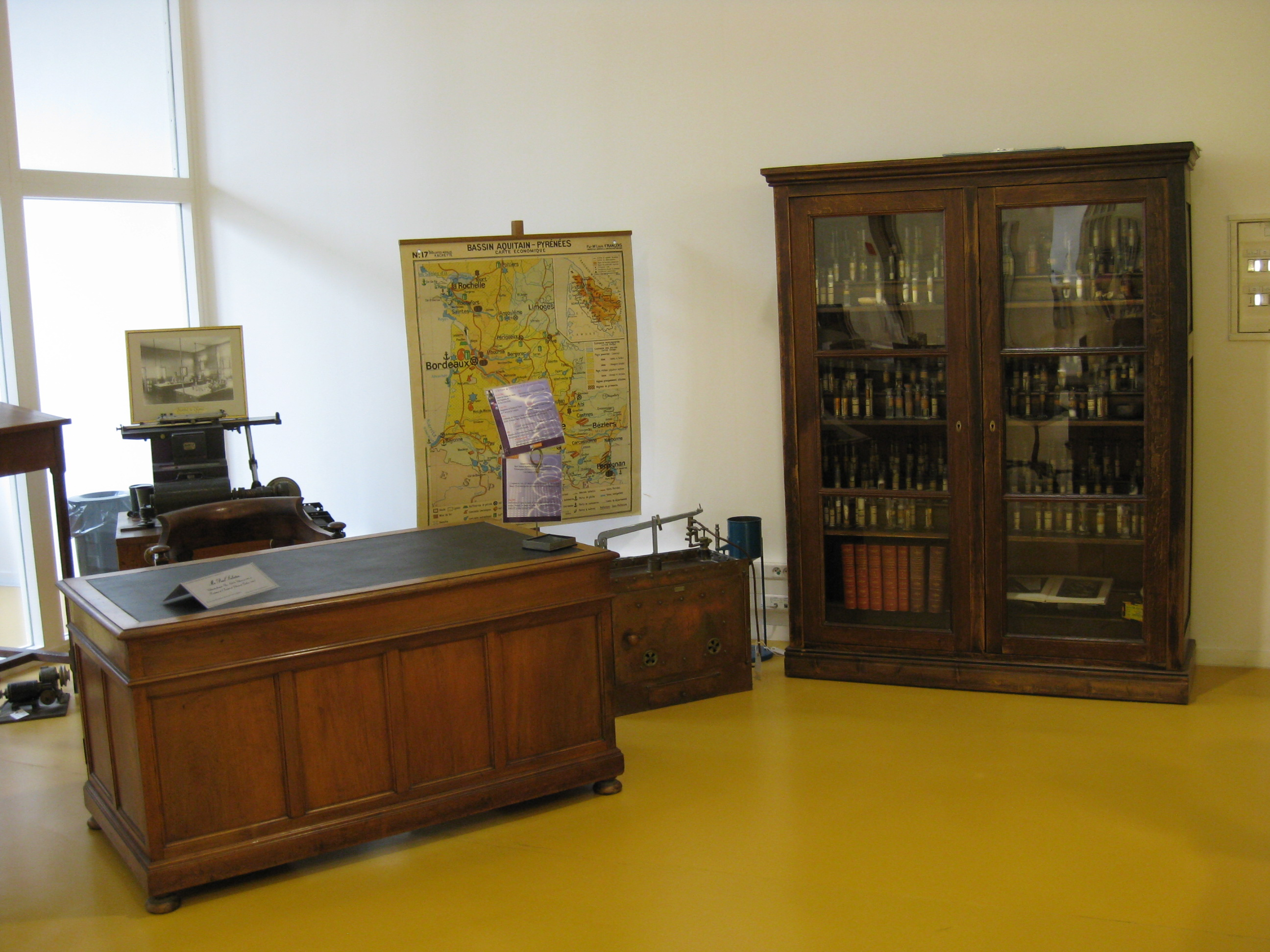
Sabatier's office desk and collection of chemicals at the University of Toulouse

Sabatier was married and had four daughters, one of whom wed the Italian chemist Emilio Pomilio.

The Paul Sabatier University in Toulouse, France was named in honour of Paul Sabatier, as is one of Carcassonne's high schools. Paul Sabatier was a co-founder of the Annales de la Faculté des Sciences de Toulouse, together with the mathematician Thomas Joannes Stieltjes.

Sabatier died on 14 August, 1941 in Toulouse at the age of 86. He was Catholic

== See also ==
- Timeline of hydrogen technologies
