= Senderens =

Senderens is a surname. Notable people with the surname include:

- Alain Senderens (1939–2017), French chef
- Jean-Baptiste Senderens (1856–1937), French priest and chemist
