= Reactive & Functional Polymers =

- Discipline: Macromolecular science
- Language: English
- Edited by: Alexander Bismarck

Publication details
- History: 1982–present
- Publisher: Elsevier
- Frequency: Monthly
- Impact factor: 3.975 (2020)

Standard abbreviations
- ISO 4: React. Funct. Polym.

Indexing
- CODEN: RFPOF6
- ISSN: 1381-5148
- OCLC no.: 39166884

Links
- Journal homepage; Online archive

Reactive & Functional Polymers is a monthly peer-reviewed scientific journal, established in 1982 and published by Elsevier. It covers research on both the science and the technology of reactive polymers (those with functional groups) including polymers and other polymers with specific chemical reactivity or other functionality. The journal publishes both original research and review papers. The editor-in-chief is Alexander Bismarck (University of Vienna).

== Abstracting and indexing ==
The journal is abstracted and indexed in:

- Chemical Abstracts Service
- Current Contents/Physical, Chemical & Earth Sciences
- EBSCO databases
- Ei Compendex
- PASCAL
- ProQuest databases
- Science Citation Index
- Scopus

According to the Journal Citation Reports, the journal has a 2020 impact factor of 3.975.
