= Calorie =

Unit of energy used in nutrition

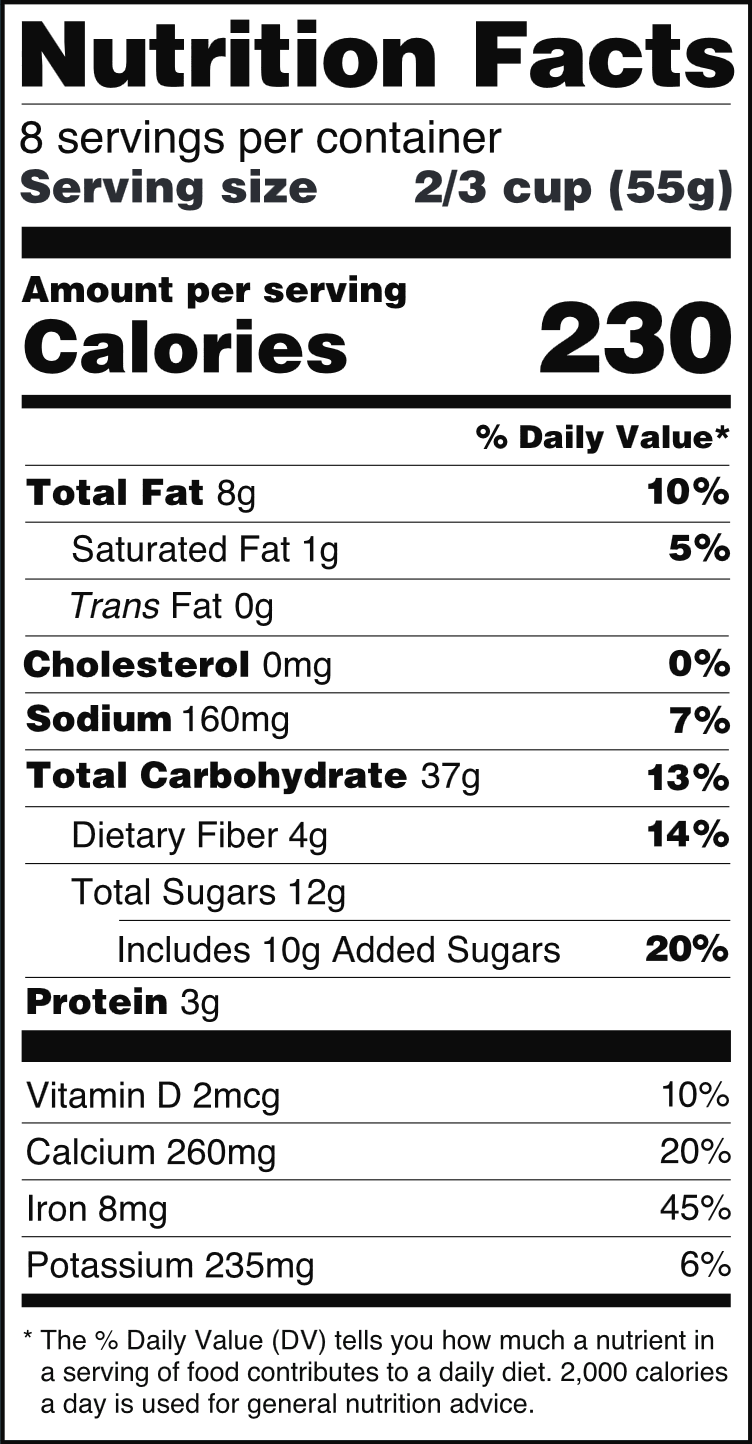
- A standard U.S. nutrition facts label highlighting the number of calories per typical serving. The given value of 230 calories is in kilocalories.

General information
- Unit of: Energy
- Symbol: cal

Conversions
1 cal in ...	... is equal to ...
- SI units: 4.184 J

The calorie is a unit of energy that originated from the caloric theory of heat. The small calorie or gram calorie is defined as the amount of heat needed to raise the temperature of a gram of water by one degree Celsius, while the large calorie represents the amount of heat needed for a kilogram of water. A large calorie may also be called a kilocalorie, since it is equivalent to 1000 small calories.

Calories are often employed in nutrition and food science to represent the energy values of foods. It is normally the large calorie (referred to simply as the calorie) that is used in this context. Some authors recommend the spelling Calorie and the symbol Cal (both with a capital C) if the large calorie is meant, to avoid confusion; however, this convention is often ignored.

In physics and chemistry, the word calorie and its symbol usually refer to the small unit, the large one being called kilocalorie (kcal). However, the calorie is not part of the International System of Units (SI) and is regarded as obsolete, having been replaced by the SI derived unit of energy, the joule (J).

The precise equivalence between calories and joules has varied over the years, but in thermochemistry and nutrition it is now generally assumed that one (small) calorie (thermochemical calorie) is equal to exactly 4.184 J, and therefore one kilocalorie (one large calorie) is 4184 J or 4.184 kJ.

== History ==
The term "calorie" comes from Latin calor 'heat'. It was first introduced by Nicolas Clément, as a unit of heat energy, in lectures on experimental calorimetry during the years 1819–1824. This was the "large" calorie. The term (written with lowercase "c") entered French and English dictionaries between 1841 and 1867.

The same term was used for the "small" unit by Pierre Antoine Favre (chemist) and Jean Thiébault Silbermann (physicist) in 1852.

In 1879, Marcellin Berthelot distinguished between gram-calorie and kilogram-calorie, and proposed using "Calorie", with capital "C", for the large unit. This usage was adopted by Wilbur Olin Atwater, a professor at Wesleyan University, in 1887, in an influential article on the energy content of food.

The smaller unit was used by U.S. physician Joseph Howard Raymond, in his 1894 textbook A Manual of Human Physiology. He proposed calling the "large" unit "kilocalorie", but the term did not catch on until some years later.

The small calorie (cal) was recognized as a unit of the CGS system in 1896, alongside the already-existing CGS unit of energy, the erg (first suggested by Clausius in 1864, under the name ergon, and officially adopted in 1882).

In 1928, there were already serious complaints about the possible confusion arising from the two main definitions of the calorie and whether the notion of using the capital letter to distinguish them was sound.

The joule was the officially adopted SI unit of energy at the ninth General Conference on Weights and Measures in 1948. The calorie was mentioned in the 7th edition of the SI brochure as an example of a non-SI unit.

The alternate spelling calory is a less-common, non-standard variant, no longer in use.

== Definitions ==
The "small" calorie is broadly defined as the amount of energy needed to increase the temperature of 1 gram of water by 1 °C (or 1 K, which is the same increment, a gradation of one percent of the interval between the melting point and the boiling point of water). The actual amount of energy required to accomplish this temperature increase depends on the atmospheric pressure and the starting temperature; different choices of these parameters have resulted in several different precise definitions of the unit.

Name	Symbol	Conversions	Definition and notes
Thermochemical calorie	cal_{th}	≡ 4.184 J ≈ 0.003964 BTU ≈ 1.162×10^{−6} kWh ≈ 2.611×10^{19} eV	The amount of energy equal to exactly 4.184 J (joules) and 1 kJ ≈ 0.239 kcal. (Note: The 'Thermochemical calorie' was defined by Rossini simply as 4.1833 international joules in order to avoid the difficulties associated with uncertainties about the heat capacity of water. It was later redefined as 4.1840 J exactly.)
4 °C calorie	cal_{4}	≈ 4.204 J ≈ 0.003985 BTU ≈ 1.168×10^{−6} kWh ≈ 2.624×10^{19} eV	The amount of energy required to warm one gram of air-free water from 3.5 to 4.5 °C at standard atmospheric pressure. (Note: The standard atmospheric pressure can be taken to be 101.325 kPa.)
15 °C calorie	cal_{15}	≈ 4.1855 J ≈ 0.0039671 BTU ≈ 1.1626×10^{−6} kWh ≈ 2.6124×10^{19} eV	The amount of energy required to warm one gram of air-free water from 14.5 to 15.5 °C at standard atmospheric pressure. Experimental values of this calorie ranged from 4.1852 to 4.1858 J. The CIPM in 1950 published a mean experimental value of 4.1855 J, noting an uncertainty of 0.0005 J.
20 °C calorie	cal_{20}	≈ 4.182 J ≈ 0.003964 BTU ≈ 1.162×10^{−6} kWh ≈ 2.610×10^{19} eV	The amount of energy required to warm one gram of air-free water from 19.5 to 20.5 °C at standard atmospheric pressure.
Mean calorie	cal_{mean}	≈ 4.190 J ≈ 0.003971 BTU ≈ 1.164×10^{−6} kWh ≈ 2.615×10^{19} eV	Defined as 1/100 of the amount of energy required to warm one gram of air-free water from 0 to 100 °C at standard atmospheric pressure.
International Steam Table calorie (1929)		≈ 4.1860 J ≈ 0.0039683 BTU ≈ 1.1630×10^{−6} kWh ≈ 2.6132×10^{19} eV	Defined as 1/860 "international" watt hours = 180/43 "international" joules exactly. (Note: The figure depends on the conversion factor between "international joules" and "absolute" (modern, SI) joules. Using the mean international ohm and volt (1.00049 Ω, 1.00034 V), the "international joule" is about 1.00019 J, using the US international ohm and volt (1.000495 Ω, 1.000330 V) it is about 1.000165 J, giving 4.18684 and 4.18674 J, respectively.)
International Steam Table calorie (1956)	cal_{IT}	≡ 4.1868 J ≈ 0.0039683 BTU = 1.1630×10^{−6} kWh ≈ 2.6132×10^{19} eV	Defined as 1.163 mWh = 4.1868 J exactly. This definition was adopted by the Fifth International Conference on Properties of Steam (London, July 1956).

The two definitions most common in older literature appear to be the 15 °C calorie and the thermochemical calorie. Until 1948, the latter was defined as 4.1833 international joules; the current standard of 4.184 J was chosen to have the new thermochemical calorie represent the same quantity of energy as before.

== Usage ==
Minimum requirement calories

=== Nutrition ===
In North America, in a nutritional context, the "large" unit is used almost exclusively. It is generally written "calorie" with lowercase "c" and symbol "cal", even in government publications. The SI unit kilojoule (kJ) may be used instead, in legal or scientific contexts. Most American nutritionists prefer the unit kilocalorie to the unit kilojoules, whereas most physiologists prefer to use kilojoules. In the majority of other countries, nutritionists prefer the kilojoule to the kilocalorie.

In Europe, on nutrition facts labels, energy is expressed in both kilojoules and kilocalories, abbreviated as "kJ" and "kcal" respectively.

In China, only kilojoules are given.

=== Food energy ===
The unit is most commonly used to express food energy, namely the specific energy (energy per mass) of metabolizing different types of food. For example, fat (triglyceride lipids) contains 9 kilocalories per gram (kcal/g), while carbohydrates (sugar and starch) and protein contain approximately 4 kcal/g. Alcohol in food contains 7 kcal/g. The "large" unit is also used to express recommended nutritional intake or consumption, as in "calories per day".

Dieting is the practice of eating food in a regulated way to decrease, maintain, or increase body weight, or to prevent and treat diseases such as diabetes and obesity. As weight loss depends on reducing caloric intake, different kinds of calorie-reduced diets have been shown to be generally effective.

=== Chemistry and physics ===
In other scientific contexts, the term "calorie" and the symbol "cal" almost always refers to the small unit; the "large" unit being generally called "kilocalorie" with symbol "kcal". It is mostly used to express the amount of energy released in a chemical reaction or phase change, typically per mole of substance, as in kilocalories per mole. It is also occasionally used to specify other energy quantities that relate to reaction energy, such as enthalpy of formation and the size of activation barriers. However, it is increasingly being superseded by the SI unit, the joule (J); and metric multiples thereof, such as the kilojoule (kJ).

The lingering use in chemistry is largely because the energy released by a reaction in aqueous solution, expressed in kilocalories per mole of reagent, is numerically close to the concentration of the reagent in moles per liter multiplied by the change in the temperature of the solution in kelvins or degrees Celsius. However, this estimate assumes that the volumetric heat capacity of the solution is 1 kcal/(L⋅K), which is not exact even for pure water.

== See also ==
- Basal metabolic rate
- Caloric theory
- Conversion of units of energy
- Empty calorie
- Food energy
- A calorie is a calorie
- Nutrition facts label
- British thermal unit
- Satiety value
- Caloric deficit
