= Convention of London (1861) =

1861 treaty between France, Spain, and the United Kingdom

- Type: Military alliance
- Drafted: 23 September 1861 – 11 October 1861
- Signed: 31 October 1861
- Location: London, United Kingdom
- Effective: 31 October 1861
- Condition: Forces meet at Vera-Cruz
- Expiration: 18 April 1862
- Signatories: Charles Joseph; Francisco Javier de Istúriz; John Russell
- Parties: France; Spain; United Kingdom
- Ratifiers: Napoleon III; Isabella II; Queen Victoria (37th Congress)
- Depositary: London, United Kingdom; Document No. 100. pp. 134–137, Vol. VIII. House Executive Documents, 2nd session, 37th Congress.
- Languages: French, English

The Convention of London was a treaty, signed by France, Spain, and the United Kingdom, on 31 October 1861. The purpose of the treaty was to agree on a course of action towards obtaining loan repayments from Mexico. Although this went against the main tenet of the Monroe Doctrine (European non-intervention in the Americas), the United States was not in a position to offer much opposition as it was engulfed in its own civil war.

It led the three countries to dispatch an expedition to Mexico to seek a complete repayment of their debt. After the French made aggressive and unreasonable demands towards the Mexican government, Spain and Britain, realising France's intention to turn Mexico into a puppet state, pulled their troops from Mexico and quickly signed treaties with Mexico allowing them an indefinite hold on the repayment of debt. The resulting struggle is known as the French intervention in Mexico by the army of the Second French Empire, also known as the Maximilian Affair and The Franco-Mexican War.

== Premise ==
The Convention of London was preceded by a quadrilateral convention in 1860, by which France, Spain, Great Britain and Prussia threatened intervention in Mexico unless the incapacity of its government was changed. The parties to the convention also invited the United States to seek a solution to the financial and social chaos in Mexico. The stalemate between the Mexican political parties, both of whose actions depended on the support of the said European nations and the United States, resulted in a six-year civil war and rendered the country bankrupt. Earlier in May the English navy had disembarked a 400-men strong contingent at San Blas to secure the Mexican Pacific coast custom houses. The ongoing civil war from 1858 resulted in both Mexican political parties becoming indebted. Aside from the country's previous loan contracts the opposing sides ran out of funds and tried to cover their expenses in any way possible. Miguel Miramón of the conservatives chose to apply for a disadvantageous loan lent by creditor firm Jecker and Company. It was composed of 15,000,000 pesos in internal bonds, 619,000 pesos in cash and 368,000 in military clothing. These loans formed the basis of the long-term French claims, which led to the French Intervention in Mexico. In 1860 Miramón took a step further and seized a British deposit of 660,000 pesos reserved for the British bondholders by the Liberal cabinet of Benito Juárez. The same year Juárez also crossed the line by illegally seizing 1,100,000 pesos at Laguna Seca that constituted the property of mainly western European merchants. He immediately returned one third of the plunder and promised to pay 12% interest on the rest after the liberals' victory in the civil war. After their victory Juárez expelled the Spanish minister for allegedly supporting the Miramón faction and his navy seized the Spanish steam frigate La Concepción. On 11 June 1861 Mexico passed the recompensation deadline of the Lacuna Seca incident and was still not ready to repay the withheld money. Next month the Mexican Government suspended to transfer payments for two years.

== European claims ==
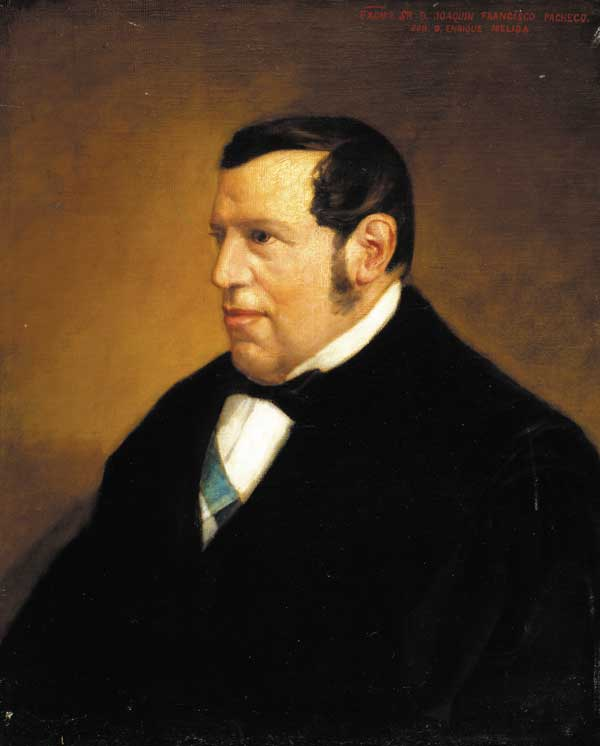
Joaquín Pacheco, expelled Spanish Minister to Mexico, one of the provisos of the Spanish claims

British financial claims dated back to the end of 1851 when, at the Doyle Convention, Mexico agreed to pay 5,000,000 pesos on a 3% yearly interest rate and a 5% redeem rate. At the time of the London Convention, these rates rose to 4 and 6 percent respectively, and the amount of debt had been reduced to 1,800,000 pesos. That same year, the Spanish and Mexican Government settled an old claim of 983,000 pesos (the Juarez party still hadn't recognized the 2 million dollars owed by the Santa Anna government) and additionally provided a new fund of 6,600,000 pesos, which was ratified two years later. The interest rate of the first bonds was set at 3% while the latter was issued at 5%. Mexico also had similar negotiations with France in 1851 and 1853. Those claims totaled 1,759,000 pesos. The French also addressed unfulfillable individual claims on the behalf of French nationals living in Mexico. Such French nationals included a tailor in Mexico City, who had been stabbed in front of his house; a bootmaker who had been robbed and seriously wounded; the relatives' of a Frenchman who was assassinated at Puebla allegedly by the Mexican police; a hotel-keeper who had been robbed twice at Palmar; a farmer who was killed in Durango; a coach-driver who was kidnapped and held for ransom several times; a colporteur who was murdered at Cuernavaca and numerous other instances of robbery, torture or ill-treatment of French subjects in Mexico. Similar claims were added to the Spanish claims as well, including the killing of five Spanish nationals at Cuernavaca and the reconciliation of the Spanish Minister to Mexico and the recovery of the lost ship Concepción. Altogether with the Jecker debt, France sought a consolidated 10,000,000 pesos. The justness of the Jecker loan became questionable when United States intelligence intercepted an 1862 letter between the Jecker family and Charles de Morny, Duke of Morny, which clearly revealed the ambiguous motivation of the French financial aid and the personal interests of the duke and emperor Napoleon III behind it. The same concerns were brought up in the case of Mexico where Juan de Borbón seemed to be a possible pretender to the Mexican throne.

== Stance of the United States ==
The United States regarded the claims as unjustifiable or even outrageous, except for those of the British; however the American government offered to cover the arrearages of the debt. This offer was rejected by the allied powers. The U.S. remained neutral, but reserved its right to mobilize and intrude upon Mexican soil on behalf of the safety of its citizens and commercial sphere of interest, if necessary. An American naval blockade was set up in the Gulf of Mexico to secure the trade routes and key ports. This led to an accidental near-collision between an American merchant vessel and the British steamboat Valorous. On another occasion, a near-collision between steamers San Jacinto of the United States and Trent of Britain caused confusion. These incidents had the potential to escalate into a full-on military conflict between the two nations and thus Britain, not wishing to engage in with war with the United States or causing her offence, decided to reduce its naval presence in the expedition.

== The treaty ==
The treaty consisted of a preamble and five articles and had the following key points:

- The assembling of expedition and the launch of a joint expedition to take over the important ports of Mexico. The ports were the main target of the intervention as 100% of the customs income on the Pacific coast and 85% of the Gulf of Mexico were spent redeeming international conventions. Permission to act freely to achieve the common goal and to protect European nationals was granted to the commanders of the operation
- None of the participating nations could gain territorial, political or financial advantage nor could attempt to get involved in internal affairs, coup d'état or violation of the rights of Mexican people during the course of the intervention
- A Commission of three was empowered to enforce the claims and oversee the distribution of reparations
- A formal invitation was forwarded to the United States to join the cause, provided that not in any case would it mean the delay of operations

== Allied arrangements before taking Veracruz ==
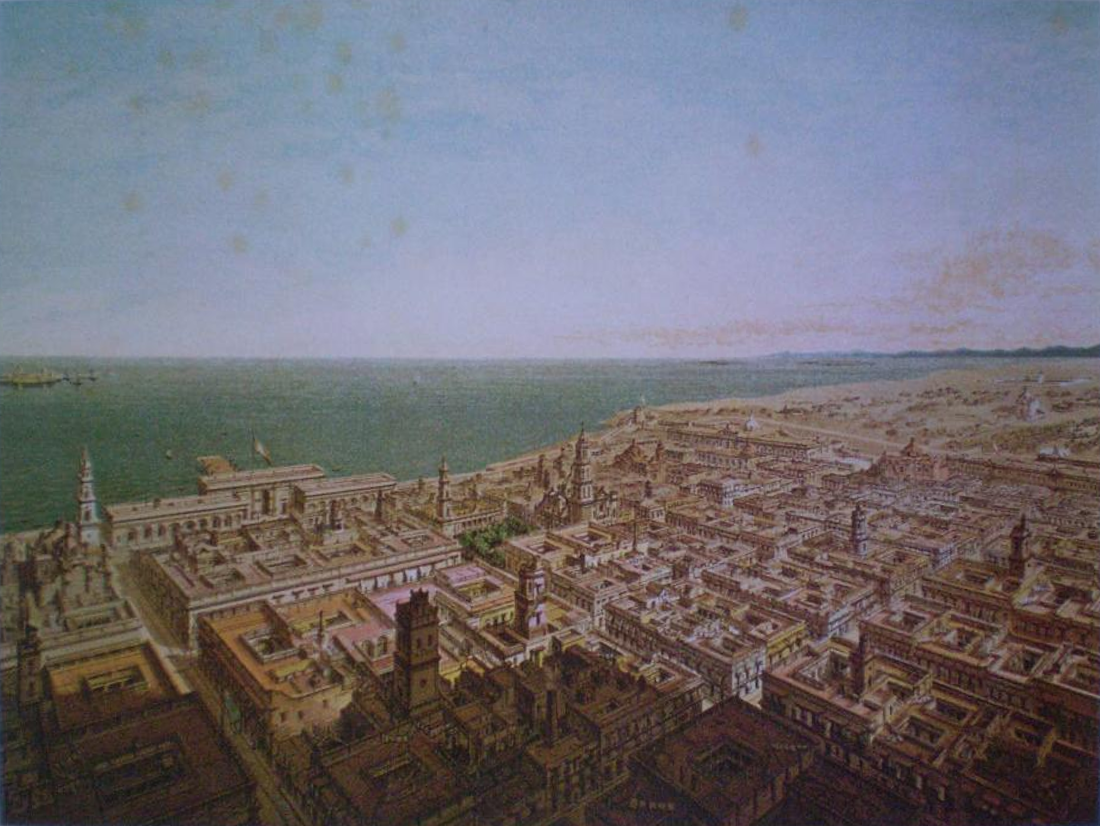
Contemporary view of Veracruz, the meeting point of the Allied forces

The following arrangements were agreed upon before the Allied landing to Mexico. (Note that these terms were not part of the treaty.)

- As a preliminary precaution for defending the French in the city, the consul of France and the senior French commander should be informed in advance of any assault, so precautionary steps could be taken.
- The occupying forces should be half Spanish and half French.
- As a main objective of the intervention, the Mexican public treasuries, the custom houses, and administrative revenues should be overseen by an allied tripartite commission, and be sealed and reserved until the arrival of the Commanders-in-Chief.
- All forts, fortification or public buildings should be left untouched, their destruction should be only in last resort, to serve the purpose of self-defense
- The Spanish naval blockade of Veracruz should not in any case affect the French maritime commerce
- After taking the city, the Spanish high command should consult Napoleon III before advancing into inner Mexico or engaging in peace talks.
- All French possessions in Mexico must remain intact.
- Commodore Dunlop, commander of the British navy, was given equal rights with his French counterpart, but could refrain from the battle in the event of lack of approval of his government.

== See also ==
- Monroe Doctrine
