= Pierre Antoine Favre =

French chemist (1813–1880)

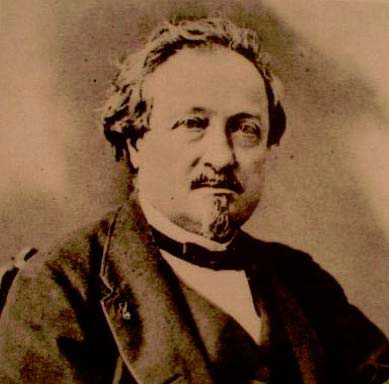
- Portrait of Pierre Antoine Favre
- Born: 20 February 1813; Lyon
- Died: 17 February 1880 (aged 66)
- Occupations: Physician, chemist

Pierre Antoine Favre (French pronunciation: [pjɛʁ ɑ̃twan favʁ]; 20 February 1813 – 17 February 1880) was a French medical doctor and chemist who specialized in conducting experiments in thermochemistry. In his 1852 work with J. T. Silberman on heat produced by chemical reactions, he popularized the use of the unit "calorie".

== Biography ==
Favre was born in Lyon on February 20, 1813. He received a medical degree from Paris University in 1835. He shifted to study chemistry after being inspired by Jean Dumas's lectures and assisted Eugene Peligot in his study of uranium salts. He was one of the two chemists who successfully demonstrated that the heats of the acid and bases were the sum of two constant terms, one dependent on the acid while the other on the bases.

Favre then studied physiological chemistry with the Paris physician Louis-Joseph Jecker (1801-1851), examining the composition of human sweat, forty litres of which he collected. One of his most important works was his investigation on the physiological chemistry of individuals who suffered from scorbutic complaints.

Favre took up a teaching position in chemistry. In 1843 he identified the relative atomic mass of zinc. His major contribution from 1844 to 1849 was in the measurement of heat evolved in chemical reactions. It has been falsely claimed that he coined the term "calorie"; he only adopted and made the term more popular among French chemists. He is noted for his calometric studies of heat reactions, such as his examination of the heat produced by the combustion of gunpowder. He joined the newly created faculty of science at the Aix-Marseille University in 1856 becoming dean in 1872 but retired in 1878 due to poor health.
