= Louis Favre =

Louis Favre may refer to:

- Louis Favre (engineer) (1826–1879), Swiss engineer
- Louis Favre (painter) (1892–1956), French painter, print maker, writer and inventor
- Louis Favre (French footballer) (1923–2008), French football player and manager
- Louis Favre (Switzerland footballer), Swiss football defender
