= Jacqueline Ficini =

French chemist (1923–1988)

- Born: Jacqueline Jeanne Ficini; October 20, 1923; Saint-Maixent-l'École, France
- Died: December 7, 1988 (aged 65); Paris, France
- Education: University of Angers
- Known for: work on functional vinyllithia and ynamines
- Awards: Le Bel Prize (1972); Jecker Prize (1979); Berthelot Vermeil Medal (1979); Academic Palms (1974)
- Scientific career
- Fields: Chemistry
- Workplaces: CNRS; University of Reims

Jacqueline Ficini (October 20, 1923 – December 7, 1988) was a French researcher and professor of chemistry. While her research addressed various fields of organic chemistry, she is remembered in particular for initiating and developing the synthetic chemistry of ynamines. (Note: The ynamines are a particularly unstable subclass of synthetic alkynes.) She was appointed a full professor at the University of Paris VI in 1965 where she spervised multiple doctorate theses. She also headed a laboratory consisting of six CNRS researchers and eight assistant professors.

In early 2026 it was announced that Ficini was one of the 72 women to have their names added to the Eiffel Tower to join the 72 men already included.

== Early life and education ==
Jacqueline Jeanne Ficini was born on October 20, 1923 in Saint-Maixent-l'École, a commune in the French department of Deux-Sèvres. She was the daughter of Jane Pontet and her father was Colonel Raoul Ficini.

She studied at the Collège Saint-Marie de Chavagne in Angoulême and then attended the universities of Paris and Angers to complete her master's degree. Also at the University of Angers, in 1952, she obtained a doctorate in physical sciences under the supervision of R. Rothstein.

== Career ==
=== Academic appointments ===
Following her doctorate, she began her career as a research assistant at CNRS in 1952 until her appointment as an instructor in chemistry at the Faculty of Sciences at the University of Paris in 1957. She then went to the United States for a postdoctoral fellowship, which she completed at Columbia University in 1960 with G. Stork as research associate. In 1962, she returned to France as a lecturer (first maître assistant, later maître de conférences) at the Faculty of Sciences at University of Reims Champagne-Ardenne. She was promoted to full professor at the University of Paris VI in 1965 where she assumed various responsibilities and headed the doctoral school of organic chemistry. From 1964 to 1988, she supervised 18 state doctoral theses (doctorats d'état) and 26 engineer theses (thèses de docteur-ingénieur). She headed a laboratory consisting of six CNRS researchers and eight assistant professors.

=== Research ===
As a researcher, in 1956 in collaboration with Professor Henri Normant, she first became interested in investigating organometallic compounds and the reactivity of Grignard reagents. With Professor Gilbert Stork, in 1961 she developed catalysts stemming from her innovative intramolecular cyclization of an unsaturated diazocarbonyl compound. While at Paris VI, she experimented with functionalized vinyl halides and alkyl lithium to develop a lithium-halogen exchange. Her most notable achievement was however her development of ynamines chemistry, demonstrating their rapid reaction with alcohols to produce O, N-acetals. Her work covered the formation of amides known as the Ficini-Claisen rearrangement, complementing the Eschenmoser rearrangement.

Specializing in the field of ynanime chemistry, Ficini was elected president of the Organic Chemistry Division of the French Chemical Society. The importance of the Ficini-Claisen rearrangement using chiral ynamides has recently been recognized, several decades after Ficini's death. In particular, the chemistry of ynamines has led to growing interest in ynamides.

During her career, Ficini spoke as an invited guest as some 130 conferences in France and internationally. She published over 120 articles, reviews and patents.

=== Affiliations ===
Ficini was elected president of the Organic Chemistry Division of the Société chimique de France. She was also a member of the American Chemical Society and was an invited professor of New York's Columbia University in 1975, 1978 and 1985.

=== Death ===
She was invited to Japan by Professor Yoshida in 1988. Upon her return to France, she died in Paris on December 7, 1988, aged 65.

== Honours and awards ==
- Le Bel Prize (1972) from the French Chemical Society for her contribution to ynamine chemistry
- Jecker Prize (1979) for her work on functional vinyllithia and ynamines
- Berthelot Vermeil Medal (1979)
- Academic Palms (1974) for services to education
- Knight of the Legion of Honour (1986)

In 2026, Jacqueline Ficini is among the 72 pioneering women scientists whose names have been proposed to be added to the commemorative frieze on the first floor of the Eiffel Tower, where only men's names have appeared until now. The plan was announced by the Mayor of Paris, Anne Hidalgo following the recommendations of a committee led by Isabelle Vauglin of Femmes et Sciences and Jean-François Martins, representing the operating company which runs the Eiffel Tower.

== Selected publications ==
In addition to her many papers, Ficini published several books:

- (1952) Sur l'ouverture des époxydes primaires-secondaires et primaires-tertiaires par l'ester malonique sodé (University thesis)
- (1974) Structures de la matière cinétique chimique, éléments de chimie physique
- (1976) Ynamine: A Versatile Tool in Organic Synthesis (Tetrahedron Report)
- (1977) Thermodynamique: Équilibres chimiques (Eléments de chimie-physique)
