= Jean-Baptiste Senderens =

French chemist (1856–1937)

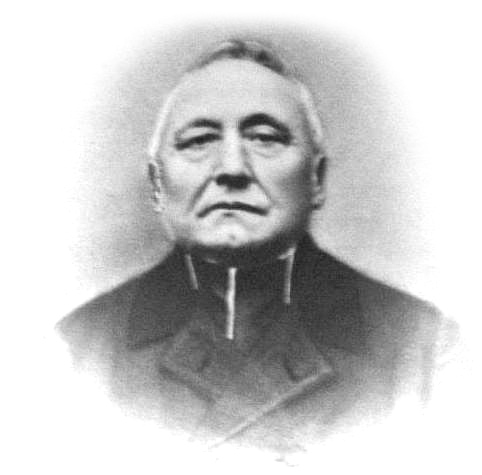
- Born: 27 January 1856; Barbachen, Hautes-Pyrénées, France
- Died: 26 September 1937 (aged 81); Barbachen, Hautes-Pyrénées, France
- Occupations: Priest, chemist
- Known for: Hydrogenation of whale oil

Jean-Baptiste Senderens (27 January 1856 – 26 September 1937) was a French priest and chemist. He was one of the pioneers of catalytic chemistry, and a co-discoverer of catalytic hydrogenation, a process used commercially to make margarine.

== Life ==
Jean-Baptiste Senderens was born on 27 January 1856 in Barbachen, Haute-Pyrénées. He studied under Édouard Filhol (1814–83), professor of chemistry at the Faculty of Sciences in Toulouse. He became a chemist, canon and Doctor of Science and Philosophy. In 1881 he began to teach chemistry at the Ecole Supérieure des Sciences of the Catholic Institute of Toulouse, and that year published his first notes for the Accounts of the French Academy of Sciences.

After ten years of collaboration with Filhol he began a collaboration of equal length with Paul Sabatier, Filhol's successor, so close that it was impossible to distinguish the work of either man. They jointly published 34 notes in the Accounts of the Academy of Science, 11 memoirs in the Bulletin of the French Chemical Society and 2 joint memoirs to the Annals of Chemistry and Physics.

In November 1899 Mgr. Zéphirin Carrière was a student at the Catholic University of Toulouse, where Senderens was teaching chemistry. Carrière recalls that Senderens had a laboratory with two sections, one for physics and one for chemistry. Sabatier trusted him to prepare the metal catalysts they had decided to use in their organic chemistry experiments.

The methanation reactions of COx were first discovered by Paul Sabatier and Senderens in 1902. Sabatier and Senderen shared the Academy of Science's Jecker Prize in 1905 for their discovery of what is now called the Sabatier–Senderens Process. This is a method of organic synthesis using hydrogenation and a heated nickel catalyst. The process is used today to convert unsaturated vegetable oils into margarine. After 1905–06 Senderens and Sabatier published few joint works. The work of Senderens and Sabatier led to the introduction in about 1907 of the hydrogenation process for hardening whale oil.

The Poulenc brothers became interested in the research into catalytic hydrogenation being undertaken by Sabatier and Senderens in Toulouse. In 1908 Poulenc Frères gave Senderens the title of Engineer and asked him to set up their laboratories and organic chemistry industry. Manufacturing was done at the Catholic University by three or four chemists working under Senderens. In 1912 the Catholic University was unable to give Senderens the space for an expansion of his laboratory, and Poulenc transported his equipment and personnel to Paris. He was installed at the Poulenc Frères establishment in Vitry-sur-Seine.

Senderens retained the title of Director of the École Supérieure des Sciences at the Catholic University until 1927. This let the French Academy of Sciences in Paris consider that he was resident in Toulouse and elect him as a correspondent member, a title incompatible with his residence in Paris. He was elected a correspondent member in the chemistry section on 4 December 1922. In 1923 Senderens was made a Knight of the Legion of Honour for his contributions to Poulenc's manufacture of war materials. Senderens died on 27 September 1937 in his native village of Barbachen, Haute-Pyrénées.

The 1,315 metres (4,314 ft) Mount Senderens at the south end of South Georgia Island was named for Senderens by the UK Antarctic Place-names Committee.

== Publications ==
Senderens' publications included:

- Édouard Filhol; Jean-Baptiste Senderens (1883), Analyse des nouvelles sources minérales de Bagnères-de-Bigorre, Bagnères-de-Bigorre: L. Péré, p. 19
- Jean-Baptiste Senderens (1884), Chauffage des vins, procédé de M. Senderens; conférence faite à l'Institut libre de Toulouse, le 13 mars 1884, Toulouse: E. Privat
- Jean-Baptiste Senderens (1890), Quels sont les vrais insecticides contre le phylloxera ? leur emploi et leur valeur économique, Toulouse: impr. de Douladoure-Privat
- Jean-Baptiste Senderens (1892), Action du soufre sur les oxydes et les sels en présence de l'eau (Thèses présentées à la Faculté des sciences de Toulouse), Toulouse: J. Fournier
- Jean-Baptiste Senderens (1897), "Expériences sur le traitement du black-rot dans la Haute-Garonne", Revue de viticulture, Paris: aux bureaux de la revue
- Jean-Baptiste Senderens (1903), Mgr Duilhé de Saint-Projet. Apologie scientifique de la foi chrétienne. Nouvelle édition, entièrement refondue par M. l'abbé J.-B. Senderens, Lettre du pape Léon XIII à l'auteur, à l'occasion de la 1re édition par Pierre Batiffol. Appendice : L'Apologétique et l'Écriture sainte, par l'abbé Maisonneuve., Paris: C. Poussielgue
- Jean-Baptiste Senderens (1908), Apologie scientifique de la foi chrétienne, d'après l'ouvrage de Mgr Duilhé de Saint-Projet, entièrement refondu par M. l'abbé J.-B. Senderens,... [Lettre du pape Léon XIII.], Paris: C. Poussielgue
- Jean-Baptiste Senderens (1928), Création et évolution, Paris: Bloud et Gay
- J. Aboulenc; Jean-Baptiste Senderens (1939), Traité de chimie organique Tome IX Monoacides, éthers-sels, industries des produits acétiques et des produits méthyliques, Paris: Masson
