= Jecker Prize =

- Native name: Prix Jecker
- Awarded for: organic chemistry
- Established: 1857

The Jecker Prize or Prix Jecker is an award in organic chemistry presented by the French Academy of Sciences. It was established in 1851 by Louis-Joseph Jecker, a Paris physician who worked in Veracruz, Mexico, before returning to Paris to conduct studies in organic chemistry. He left 200,000 francs in his will to the French Academy of Sciences.

== Origins ==
Louis-Joseph Jecker (24 July 1801 – 13 March 1851) was born in Porrentruy to miller Xavier. He studied at Porrentruy and Strasbourg before going to Paris where he studied medicine. He worked with Dupuytren at the Hôtel-Dieu and received a doctorate in 1824 and a surgical doctorate in 1825. In 1826 he went to Veracruz, Mexico, and gained prominence during the civil war. He worked with the Mexican upper class and he was involved in establishing a medical school where he taught in Spanish. He sent specimens of natural history to the College of Porrentruy and was a collector of art. He returned to Paris in 1838 briefly and went back to Mexico where he was associated with the French consulate. Jecker's brother, Jean Baptiste Jecker, was a banker in Mexico and his son had visited Paris where he was thought to be an agent of the former French empire and was arrested and shot in the prison of La Roquette. In 1845 he moved to Paris and worked at the Beaujon Hospice. Poor health led him to give up surgery and he bequeathed 250000 francs to the French Academy of Sciences but the amount was reduced to 200000 by his heirs. The Jecker prize was established in 1857 and the first recipient was Louis Pasteur.

== Recipients ==
- Louis Pasteur (1861)
- Thomas Graham (1862)
- Charles Wurtz (1864)
- Paul Schützenberger (1872)
- Édouard Grimaux (1875)
- Auguste Houzeau (1877)
- François Stanislas Cloëz (1877)
- A. Le Bel (1881)
- Auguste Béhal (1881 and 1900)
- G. Chancel (1884)
- Roberto Duarte Silva (1885)
- Gustave Bouchardat (1892)
- Camille Chabrié (1894)
- Charles Joseph Tanret (1895)
- Victor Auger (1896 et 1928)
- Daniel Berthelot (1898)
- Alphonse Buisine (1898)
- Albin Haller (1898)
- Jean-Baptiste Senderens (1905)
- Paul Sabatier (1905)
- Victor Grignard (1906)
- Charles Moureu, Marcel Delépine (1907)
- Edmond Blaise (1907 and 1917)
- Marcel Guerbet (1909)
- Marc Tiffeneau (1911 and 1923)
- Amand Valeur (1913)
- Ernest Fourneau (1919 and 1931)
- Charles Dufraisse (1925 and 1936)
- Raymond Cornubert (1939)
- Pauline Ramart (1941)
- Georges Dupont (1944)
- Léo Marion (1963)
- Jacques-Émile Dubois (1965)
- Guy Ourisson (1971)
- Jacqueline Ficini (1979)
- Jean-Louis Rivail (1989)
- André Collet (1991)
- Ivan Huc (2008)
