= Jean Thiébault Silbermann =

French physicist (1806–1865)

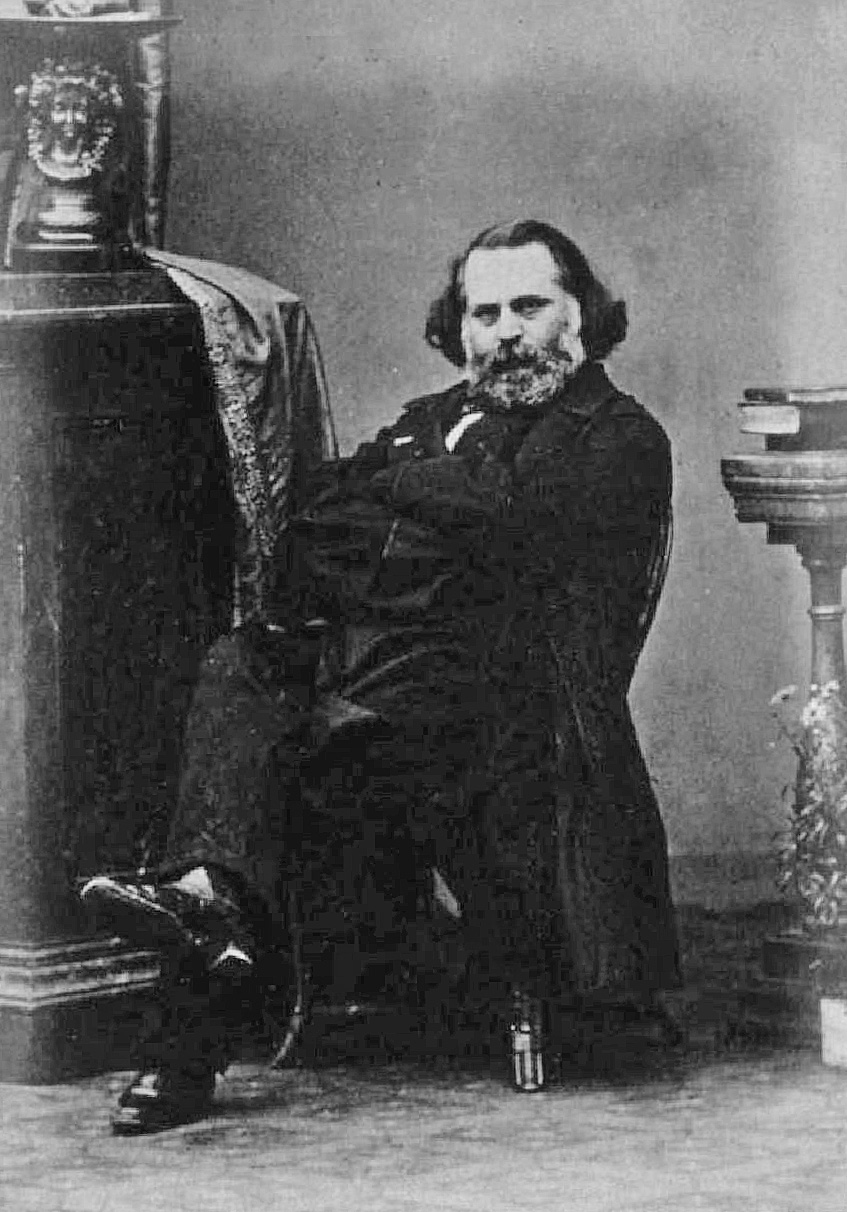

Jean Thiébault Silbermann (1 December 1806 – 4 July 1865) was a French physicist and maker of scientific instruments who pioneered research in thermochemistry. He worked as a curator at the Conservatoire des Arts et Métiers.

== Life and work ==
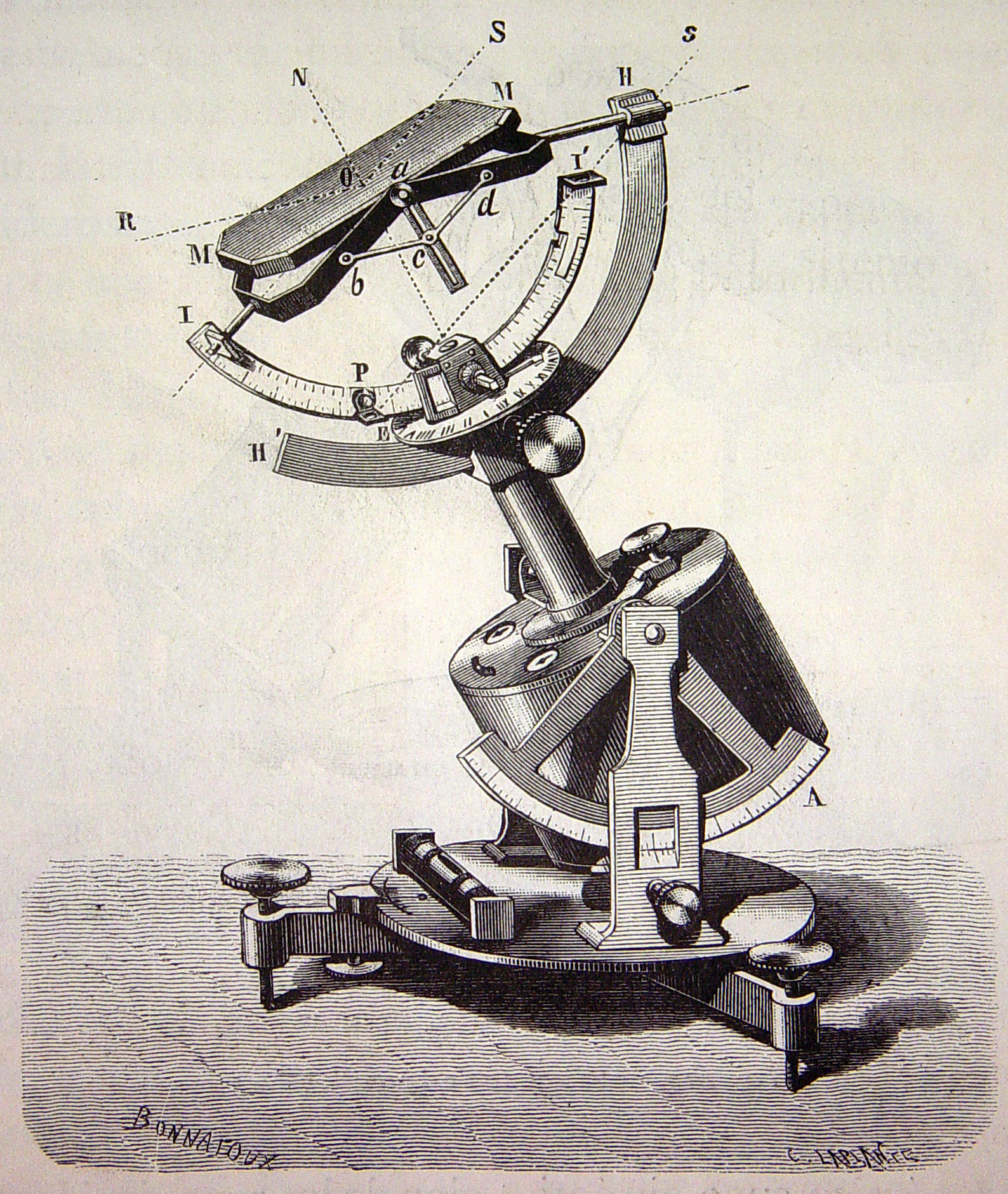
Silbermann's heliostat

Silbertmann was born in Pont-d’Aspach (Haut-Rhin) where his father Jacques was an artillery captain in the Napoleonic army married to Marie Hirt. After community school at Burnhaupt-le-Bas he studied at Neuf-Brisach where his father was posted in 1814. He studied at the faculty of sciences in Strasbourg where he became interested in the physics teachings of J. S. Herrenschneider and then went to Paris where he worked as an apprentice under the scientific instrument maker François-Antoine Jecker (1765-1834) who was known to his father. He also attended lectures at the Sorbonne in physics and chemistry under Gay-Lussac and Thénard. In 1826 he became a collaborator of Claude Pouillet at the Collège Bourbon. He conducted experiments on electricity and heat. He also became a tutor for the Orléans family. He also taught drawing. In 1829 he began to work in the bridges and roads department while also assisting in the production of plates for a textbook written by Pouillet. He mapped the course of the Rhine between Basel and Strasbourg. In 1830 he married Marie-Ursule Simon. In 1835, he returned as an instructor of physics at the faculty of science in Paris and also worked at the Conservatoire until 1848 when he was made curator at the Conservatoire des Arts et Métiers. Silbermann worked on the use of electroplating to reproduce medals, discovered gas condensation on platinum plates and worked on thermochemistry with Pierre Favre. He constructed a diffraction setup, a sympiezometer, cathetometer, a pyrometer, a dilatometer and a heliostat (along with Jean-Baptiste Soleil). He developed an alcohol measurement scale.
