= Édouard Filhol =

French scientist (1814–1883)

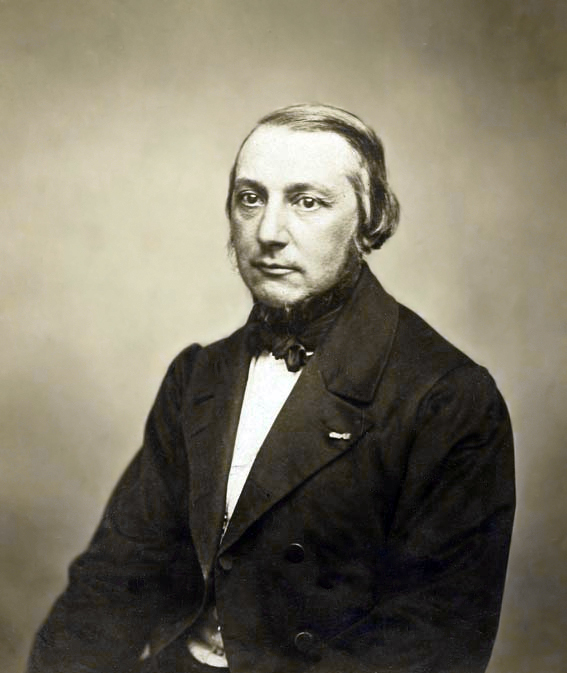
- Born: 7 October 1814
- Died: 25 June 1883 (aged 68)
- Scientific career
- Thesis: Etudes sur les changements de volume qu'éprouvent les corps pendant la combinaison (1844)

Jean Pierre Bernard Édouard Filhol (7 October 1814–25 June 1883) was a French scientist.

In 1854, Édouard Filhol was appointed Professor of Chemistry at the University of Toulouse, a position he held until 1882. Later, in 1865, he became director of the Museum de Toulouse. It was the first museum in the world to open a gallery of prehistory thanks to the collaboration of Emile Cartailhac, Jean-Baptiste Noulet and Eugène Trutat. In the same year, he became director of the School of Medicine and Pharmacy at the University of Toulouse.

Jean-Baptiste Senderens studied under Édouard Filhol, professor of Chemistry at the Faculty of Sciences in Toulouse. After ten years of collaboration with Filhol, he began a collaboration of equal length with Paul Sabatier, Filhol's successor.

From 1867 to 1870, Édouard Filhol was Mayor of Toulouse.

He was the father of the naturalist Henri Filhol (1843–1902)

== Sources ==
- Alcouffe, Alain (December 2006), La loi de 1905 et l'université de Toulouse ou la La laïcité au bon sens du terme (in French), Iesr – Toulouse
