= Saxel =

- Commune
- Location of Saxel
- Location within France Location within Auvergne-Rhône-Alpes
- Coordinates: 46°14′37″N 6°23′46″E
- Country: France
- Region: Auvergne-Rhône-Alpes
- Department: Haute-Savoie
- Arrondissement: Thonon-les-Bains
- Canton: Sciez

Government
  - Mayor (2020–2026): Frédéric Guiberti
- Area^{1}: 5.63 km^{2} (2.17 sq mi)
- Highest elevation: 1,297 m (4,255 ft)
- Lowest elevation: 832 m (2,730 ft)
- Population (2023): 518
  - Density: 92.0/km^{2} (238/sq mi)
- Time zone: UTC+01:00 (CET)
  - Summer (DST): UTC+02:00 (CEST)
- INSEE/Postal code: 74261 /74420
- ^{1} French Land Register data, which excludes lakes, ponds, glaciers > 1 km^{2} (0.386 sq mi or 247 acres) and river estuaries.

Saxel is a commune in the Haute-Savoie department in the Auvergne-Rhône-Alpes region in south-eastern France.

The painter Louis Favre built a house here.

== See also ==
- Communes of the Haute-Savoie department
