= Charles Dufraisse =

French chemist

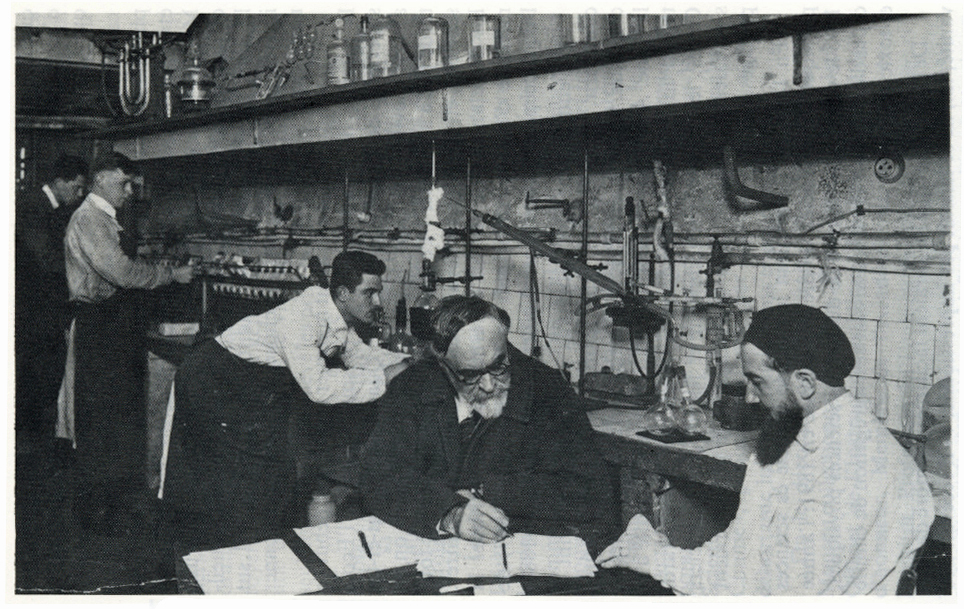
- Charles Moureu and Dufraisse (on the right) in their laboratory in Paris
- Born: August 20, 1885; Excideuil, France
- Died: August 5, 1969 (aged 83); Excideuil, France
- Scientific career
- Fields: Chemistry
- Institutions: ESPCI Paris; Collège de France

Charles Dufraisse (20 August 1885, in Excideuil – 5 August 1969, in Excideuil) was a French chemist. With Charles Moureu, he conducted pioneer research of autoxidation and antioxidants.

In 1921 he received his doctorate at Paris with the thesis Contribution à l'étude de la stéréoisomérie éthylénique, and served as an associate director in the laboratory of organic chemistry at the Collège de France. In 1927 he was named a professor at the École supérieure de physique et de chimie industrielles de la Ville de Paris, and in 1942 became a professor at the Collège de France. He was cofounder of the Institut français du caoutchouc (French Institute of Rubber).

== Selected writings ==
- Contribution à l'étude de la stéréoisomérie éthylénique, (doctoral thesis, 1921).
- Méfaits et bienfaits de l'oxygène, 1930.
- L'oxydabilité considérée comme test d'état du caoutchouc, 1939.
- Applications de l'oxydabilité : Méthode manométrique : discussion, exemples (with Jean Le Bras, 1939).
- Le Caoutchouc, quelques aspects théoriques, 1942.
- L'état actuel du problème antioxygène, 1946.
  - Writings by Dufraisse that have been published in English:
- "The ultra-rapid testing of rubber : the testing of its oxidizability in one quarter of an hour" (with Jean Le Bras).
- "The negative catalysis of auto-oxidation. Anti-oxygenic activity" (with Charles Moureu).
- "Catalysis and auto-oxidation. Anti-oxygenic and pro-oxygenic activity" (with Charles Moureu).
- "Messel memorial contribution the negative catalysis of auto oxidation. Anti-oxygenic activity" (with Charles Moureu).
- "Aging of rubber and its retardation by the surface application of antioxygens 1. Diffusion process" (with Charles Moureu, Pierre Lotte).
