= Louis Favre (painter) =

French painter

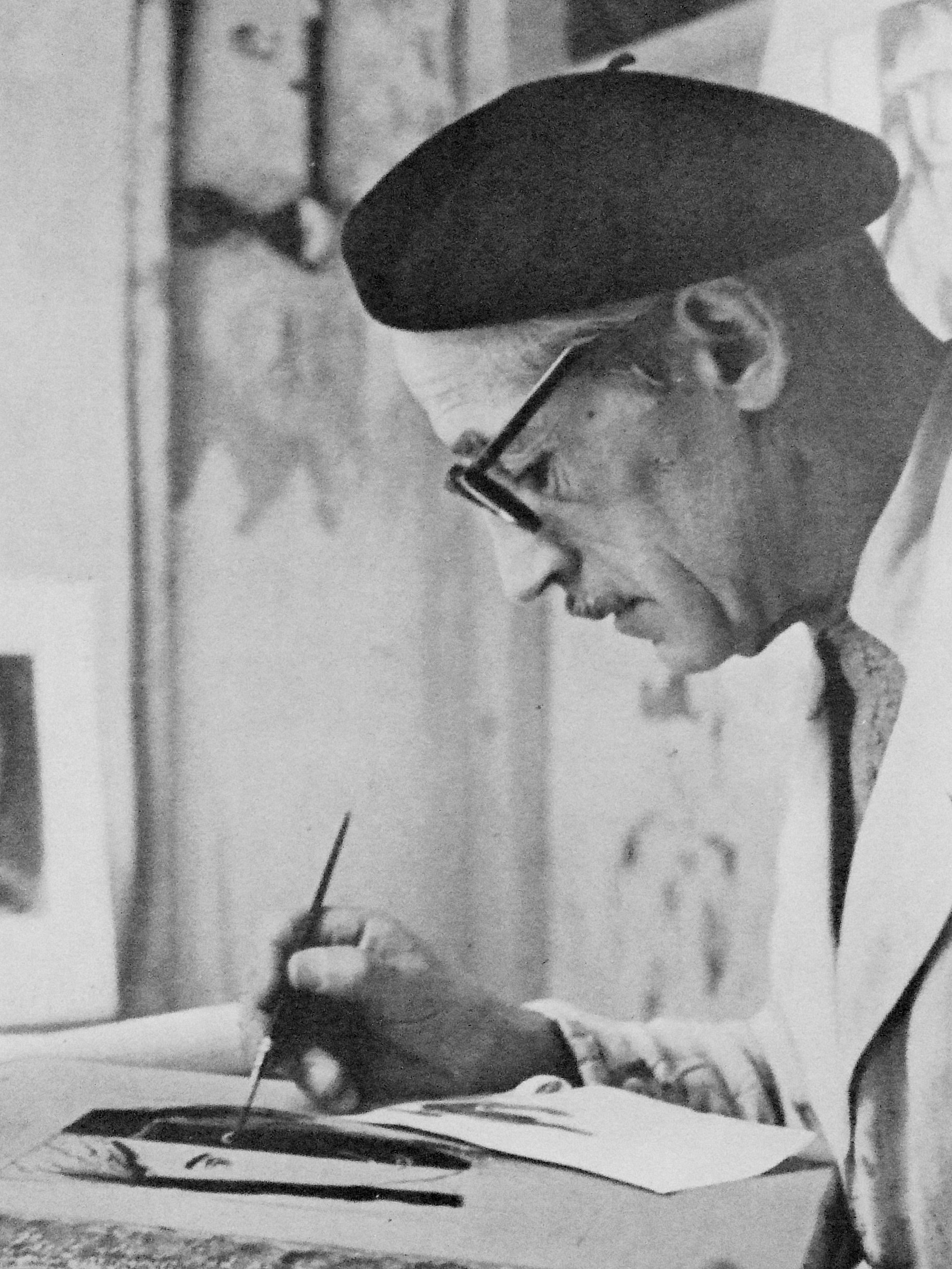
Favre Wikipedia foto

Louis Favre (15 September 1892 – 17 April 1956) was a French painter, print maker, writer and inventor who spent most of his life in France and the Netherlands.

He is known internationally for his labor-intensive technique. His works achieved great popularity, particularly in the Netherlands.

== Biography ==
Favre was born in Annemasse (Haute Savoie) in Maison Grillet on the Place d'Eglise. He moved to Paris in 1912. He started as an industrial designer, but soon devoted himself entirely to painting. He had no formal training and was completely self-taught.

As a soldier during World War I, he often stood in the trenches, which gave him chronic bronchitis.

Back in Paris in 1919, he met Gertrude Stein. She bought several of his paintings. His connection with her increased his popularity in the United States. Favre later met the sculptor Jacques Lipchitz, whose friendship significantly impacted his artistic development.

In 1924 he worked with an American friend in Vence, near Nice. On 5 May, he married Louise Henriette Turpin in Puteaux. The following year he worked in Cahors at the invitation of the French Minister De Monzie.

In 1926, after years of experimentation, Favre discovered the techniques of the ancient Egyptians of working with wax paint.

With the support of the French government, Favre made his first trip to Morocco in 1927. He held his first major exhibition in Gallery 'Au Sacre de printemps' in Paris, where he was noticed by French art critic Waldemar George. He joined prominent literary circles, where his talent was recognized by Paul Dermée and Céline Arnaud.

Favre made his second trip to Africa in 1929, where he worked in Algiers.

In 1930 Favre made inventions in the field of radio engineering.

Throughout his life he wrote novellas, Chinese fairy tales, and radio-plays. He also wrote a novel for which he got the Prix de Lugdunum. Furthermore, he painted around Annecy and Geneva. He built a house in Saxel with his Dutch friend, the painter Louis Bos.

After the beginning of the Second World War he fled to Lyon and began studying color lithography. He had an exhibition in Lyon in 1947.

In 1946, Favre decided to give up painting and devote himself entirely to lithography. Sometimes he used 13 blocks for a lithograph. His first lithograph—Les Joueurs—appeared in eight colors on the—Exposition Gravures Francaises Contemporaines—in Berlin. He also had an exhibition in Vienna that year. Both exhibitions were a success and the lithograph was almost instantly sold out. His wife died in Saxel in June.

Favre worked in The Hague, the Netherlands, in 1947 for the publisher Stols and illustrated 'Une saison en enfer' by Rimbaud.

In 1948 he had an exhibition in the Victoria and Albert Museum in London. Mouton & Co (The Haque) offered him a contract to make limited edition lithographs and to illustrate stories by Edgar Allan Poe.

He married Anna Cornelia Bosma on 13 July 1949 in The Hague. He had a studio in Paris, Rue de La Tour- d'Auvergne 44, where he worked half of the year. The rest of the year he lived on the Van Hogendorpstraat 103 in The Hague. He stayed in London that year.

In 1951 his colour lithography was shown at an exhibition in Gallery Redfern in New York. In 1954 he represented France at the Venice Biennale and took part in the Third International Biennal of Contemporary Color Lithography in Cincinnati, where he also took part in 1956. He had an exhibition in Milan.

In 1955 Favre became seriously ill and went to his friend Lucien Archimard in Geneva. Later he moved to Saxel. As his illness worsened, he went to Rouret, near Nice, where he made scale models for the Church windows of Thursy.

Favre died in Annemasse on 17 April 1956.

== Works in public collection ==
- Museum of Newark (USA)
- Palais de la Residence Générale du Maroc/Rabat
- Museum of Cincinnati (USA)
- Musée d'Art et d'Histoire (Geneva)
- Museum of Montivideo
- Museum of Helsinki
- Museum Victoria and Albert (London)
- Cabinet des Estampes (Boston)
- Bibliothèque Nationale (Paris)
- Museum de la Ville (Paris)
- Collection Cone (Baltimore)
- Collection Vallotion (Lausanne)
- Collection Gertrude Stein (New York)
- Collection Lucien Archinard (Geneva)
- Collection Pierre Bertin (Paris)
- Collection Pierre Berès (Paris)
- Groninger Museum (Groningen, the Netherlands)

== Exhibitions ==
- Exposition 'Le Sacre du Printemps' (Paris 1927)
- Exposition in Lyon (1943)
- Victoria and Albert Museum (London 1948)
- The Redfern Gallery(New York 1951)
- Musée d'Art et d'Histoire (Geneva 1952)
- Exposition Museum Boymans Van Beuningen (Rotterdam, the Netherlands 1952)
- Cercle d'Echanges Artistiques Internationaux (1954)
- Exposition Milan (1954), Museum Gouda (the Netherlands 1955)
- Gallery Sagot - Le Garrec (Paris 1957)
- Expoisiton in Nantes (1958)
- Exposition Ville Annemasse (1960)
- Musée des Beaux Arts (Poitiers)
- Exposition British Museum (London)
- Galerie d'Art Contemporaine (Paris)
- Frans Hals Museum (Haarlem, the Netherlands)
- Groninger Museum (Groningen, the Netherlands 2005)

== Salons ==
- Salon des Indépendants
- Salon d'Automne (Paris 1948)
- Biennal of Cincinnati (1954 and 1956)
- Venice Biennale (1954)

== Lithographs ==
The lithographs of Favre are documented in the book Contemporary Art, Masters of the Print. Groninger Museum possesses all his lithographs and a number of paintings. His paintings are less well documented.

Favre made 44 large lithographs. He usually made 45 to 55 copies of about 25,6 x 19.7 inches.

- 1946 Les Joueurs; Femme en Vert; Grenades; Masque
- 1947 La Pianiste; Christ I; Duo; Spleen
- 1949 Arlequin; La Fenetre; L'Oiseau
- 1950 Nu; La Table; La Printemps Hollandais; Grand Spleen
- 1951 Baladins; Tete de Femme; Clown Bleu; Christ II; La Pendule
- 1952 La Vetrail; Bal Musette; Été; Été (variante air bleu); Femme Assise; Africaine
- 1953 Recontre; Trinite Atomique; Danse; Sirene I; Sirene II; Cirque I; Cirque II; Cirque III
- 1954 Christ en Croix; Piéta; Les deux Arlequins + Variant A; Creation d'Arlequin; Joie; Procession; Le nuit de Noël; Meditation; Saint Francois d'Assise.

== Illustrator ==
Favre illustrated books and a calendar:

- 1948 Une Saison en enfer, Arthur Rimbaud
- 1949 Calendrier 'Mouton & Co"
- 1949 La Corbeau, Edgar Poe
- 1950 La Nove de lépave

== Legacy ==
In 1993 Favre's widow donated more than 90 lithographs, drawings, gouaches, wax-paintings and illustrated books to Groninger Museum. She had kept them after her husband's death, according to his wishes.

== See also ==
- List of French artists
