= Thomas Graham (chemist) =

British chemist (1805–1869)

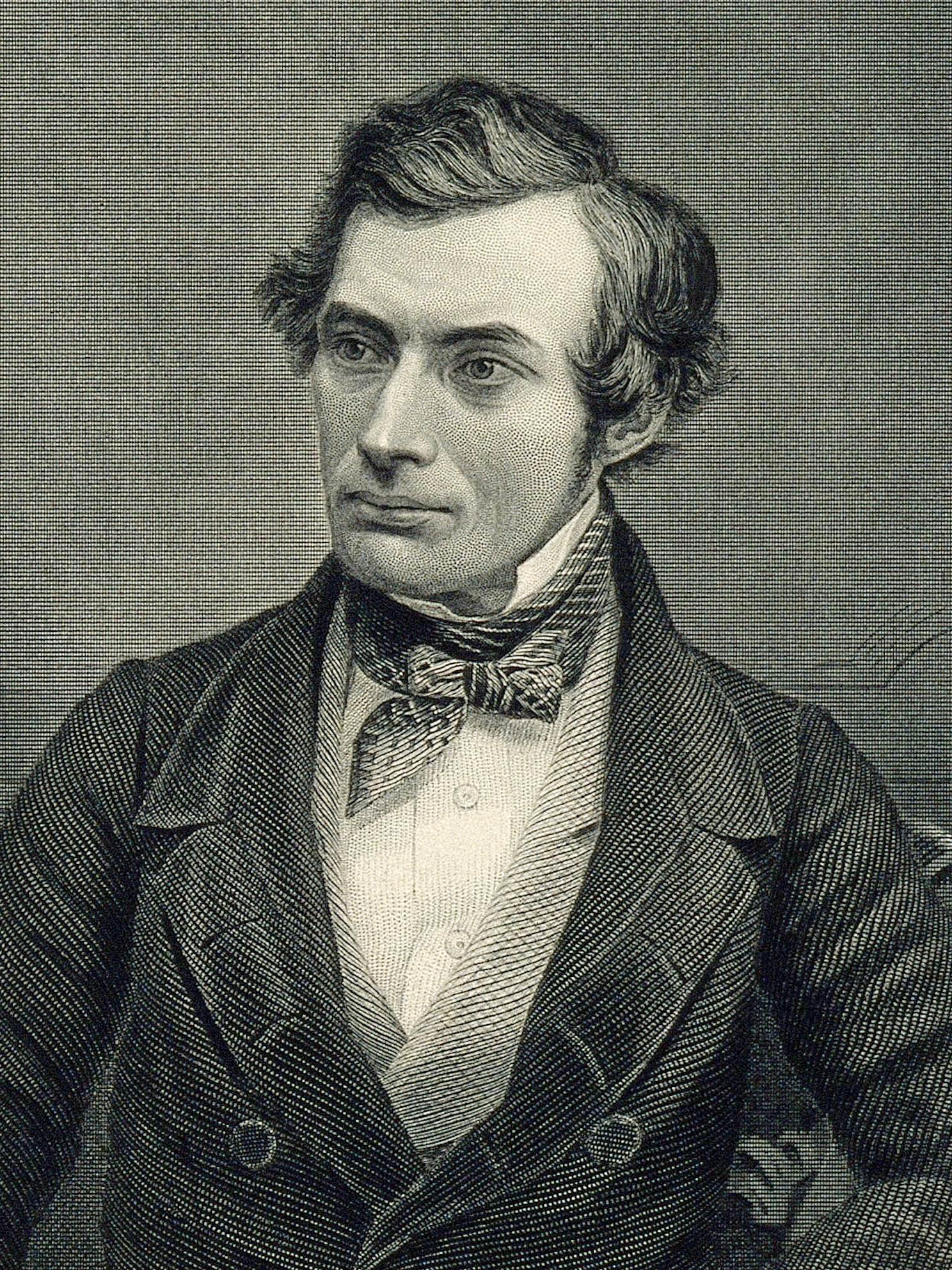
- Graham in 1856
- Born: 21 December 1805; Glasgow, Scotland
- Died: 16 September 1869 (aged 63); London, England
- Education: University of Glasgow; University of Edinburgh
- Known for: Graham's law; Dialysis
- Awards: Royal Medal (1838, 1850); Copley Medal (1862)
- Scientific career
- Fields: Chemistry
- Workplaces: Anderson's Institution; University College London

Signature
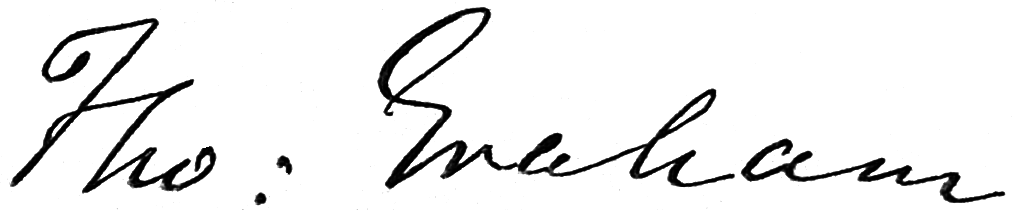

Thomas Graham FRSE, FRS (20 December 1805 – 11 September 1869) was a British chemist known for his pioneering work in dialysis and the diffusion of gases. He is regarded as one of the founders of colloid chemistry.

== Life ==
Graham was born in Glasgow, Scotland and was educated at the High School of Glasgow. Graham's father was a successful textile manufacturer, and wanted his son to enter into the Church of Scotland. Instead, defying his father's wishes, Graham became a student at the University of Glasgow in 1819. There he developed a strong interest in chemistry, studying under Professor Thomas Thomson, who was impressed and influenced by the young man. He left the university after receiving his MA in 1824.

He later studied medicine at the University of Edinburgh and then briefly taught chemistry at the Glasgow University Portland Street Medical School. In 1828 he was elected a Fellow of the Royal Society of Edinburgh, his proposer was Edward Turner. He won the Society's Keith Medal for the period 1831–33.

in 1830 he was appointed to be the first professor of chemistry at the Anderson's Medical School, a post later named the Freeland Chair of Chemistry. He also delivered lectures to the Glasgow Mechanics' Institution before moving to take up a professorship at the University of London, where Graham founded the Chemical Society of London in 1841. In 1866, he was elected a foreign member of the Royal Swedish Academy of Sciences.

His final position was the Master of the Mint, where he stayed from 1855 until his death. He was the last person to hold that position: afterwards the post was amalgamated into the Chancellor of the Exchequer while all the actual responsibilities were transferred to the Deputy Master.

He died in Gordon Square in London but his body was transported to Glasgow for burial in the family plot at Glasgow Cathedral.

== Publications ==
- On the Law of Diffusion of Gases (1833)

== Scientific works ==
Thomas Graham is known for his studies on the behavior of gases, which resulted in his formulation of two relationships, both since becoming known as "Graham's laws," the first regarding gas diffusion, and the second regarding gas effusion. In the former case, Graham deduced that when measured repeatedly under the same conditions of pressure and temperature, the rate of diffusive mixing of a gas is inversely proportional to the square root of its density, and given the relationship between density and molar mass, also inversely proportional to the square root of its molar mass. In the same way, in the latter case, regarding effusion of a gas through a pin hole in to a vacuum, Graham deduced that the rate of effusion of a gas is inversely proportional to the square root of its molar mass. These two are sometimes referred to as a combined law (describing both phenomena).

In applied areas, Graham also made fundamental discoveries related to dialysis, a process used in research and industrial settings, as well as in modern health care. Graham's study of colloids resulted in his ability to separate colloids and crystalloids using a so-called "dialyzer", using technology that is a rudimentary forerunner of technology in modern kidney dialysis machines. These studies were foundational in the field known as colloid chemistry, and Graham is credited as one of its founders.

He also proposed the association theory which claimed that the substances such as cellulose or starch that we now know are polymers are composed from smaller molecules hold together by unknown forces. It remained the most popular explanation until Hermann Staudinger's macromolecular theory of 1920s.

== Honours, activities, and recognition ==
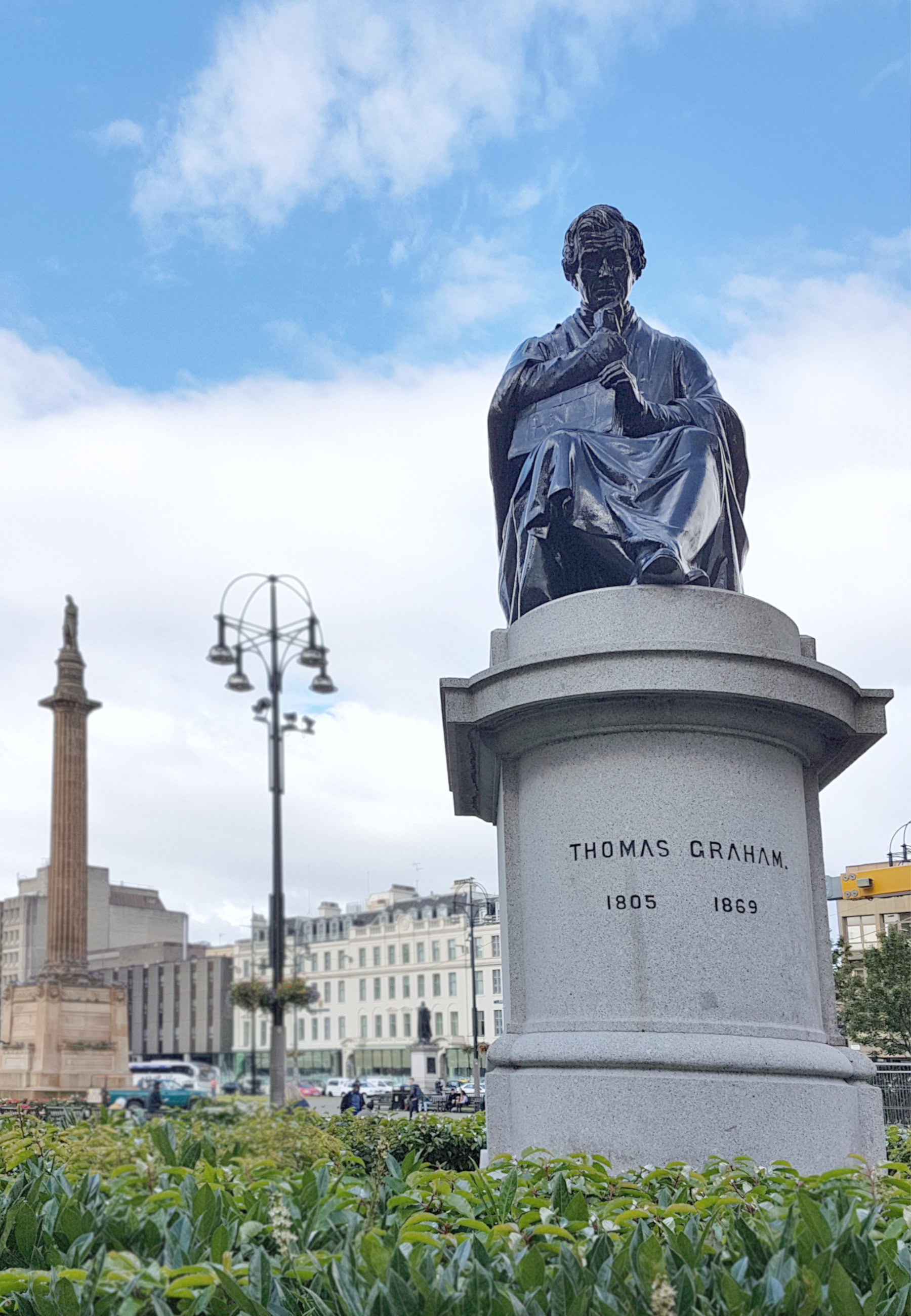
Statue of Graham in George Square, Glasgow

- Elected an Honorary Fellow of the Royal Society of Edinburgh (1828) receiving its Keith Medal for 1831–33
- Fellow of the Royal Society (1836)
- First President of the Chemical Society of London (1841)
- Royal Medal of the Royal Society (1837 and 1863)
- Honorary doctorate (DCL) from the University of Oxford (1853)
- Copley Medal of the Royal Society (1862)
- Prix Jecker of the Paris Academy of Sciences (1862)
- A statue of Graham, sculpted by William Brodie in George Square in Glasgow was erected by the city in 1872
- The Royal College of Science and Technology (the successor of Anderson's Institution, where Graham once worked, which ultimately became the University of Strathclyde), named its new Chemistry building the Thomas Graham Building in 1962.
- The headquarters of the Royal Society of Chemistry in Cambridge, England is named Thomas Graham House

== See also ==
- Graham's law
- Gaseous diffusion
- Dialysis
- Colloid
- Fick's laws of diffusion

Government offices
Preceded by Sir John Herschel, Bt	Master of the Mint; 1855–1869	Office abolished Robert Lowe as Chancellor of the Exchequer
