= Barbachen =

- Commune
- Coat of arms
- Location of Barbachen
- Location within France Location within Occitanie
- Coordinates: 43°26′05″N 0°07′35″E
- Country: France
- Region: Occitania
- Department: Hautes-Pyrénées
- Arrondissement: Tarbes
- Canton: Val d'Adour-Rustan-Madiranais
- Intercommunality: Adour Madiran

Government
  - Mayor (2020–2026): Magali Larrang
- Area^{1}: 3.04 km^{2} (1.17 sq mi)
- Elevation: 300 m (980 ft)
- Highest elevation: 281 m (922 ft)
- Lowest elevation: 194 m (636 ft)
- Population (2023): 41
  - Density: 13/km^{2} (35/sq mi)
- Time zone: UTC+01:00 (CET)
  - Summer (DST): UTC+02:00 (CEST)
- INSEE/Postal code: 65061 /65140
- ^{1} French Land Register data, which excludes lakes, ponds, glaciers > 1 km^{2} (0.386 sq mi or 247 acres) and river estuaries.

Barbachen is a commune in the Hautes-Pyrénées department in southwestern France.

== Population ==
Historical population
| Year | Pop. | ±% p.a. |
|---|---|---|
| 1968 | 47 | — |
| 1975 | 42 | −1.59% |
| 1982 | 44 | +0.67% |
| 1990 | 39 | −1.50% |
| 1999 | 42 | +0.83% |
| 2007 | 50 | +2.20% |
| 2012 | 53 | +1.17% |
| 2017 | 53 | +0.00% |
| 2023 | 41 | −4.19% |
Source: INSEE

== See also ==
- Communes of the Hautes-Pyrénées department
