= Roberto Duarte Silva =

Cape Verdean chemist (1837–1889)

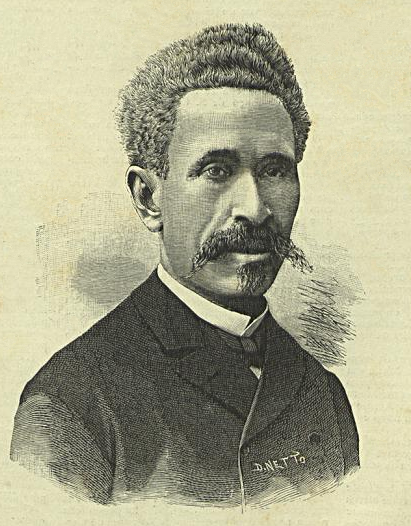
- Born: 25 February 1837; Ribeira Grande, Santo Antão, Portuguese Cape Verde
- Died: 2 August 1889 (aged 52); Paris, France
- Education: University of Lisbon
- Awards: Jecker Prize (1885)
- Scientific career
- Fields: Chemistry

Roberto Duarte da Silva (25 February 1837, Ribeira Grande, Cape Verde - 8 February 1889, Paris) was a Cape Verdean chemist.

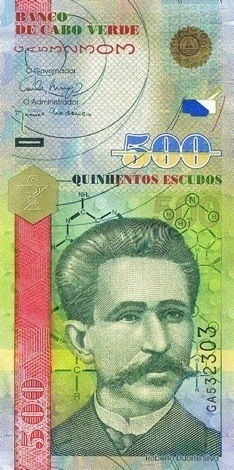
Duarte Silva's portrait on the Cape Verdean escudo

== Career ==
Duarte Silva began at the age of 14 as an apprentice in a pharmacy. Later he came to Lisbon to work in the Farmácia Azevedo, and studied at the School of Pharmacy (Escola de Farmácia) of the University of Lisbon, there, he also received his alma mater. For some years he lived in Macau and Hong Kong, where he founded his own pharmacy. He studied the compounds of amyl bases and propylamine at the laboratory of Charles Adolphe Wurtz, and achieved total synthesis of glycerine at a laboratory of Charles Friedel.

In 1863 he went to Paris, and taught analytical chemistry at the École des Mines de Paris (now the Mines ParisTech), the Ecole Centrale des Arts et Manufactures (now the École Centrale Paris), and the École supérieure de physique et de Chimie industrial de la ville de Paris from 1882 until his death. Through these years he taught and was active in research, especially in the field of organic chemistry.

Duarte Silva was presented with the Jecker Prize (Prix Jecker) by the French Academy of Sciences in 1885. In 1887 he became president of the Société Chimique de France. Among his students was chemist Charles Lepierre, who settled in 1888 at his suggestion in Portugal. A street is named in his honor in São Domingos de Benfica, in Lisbon.

== Legacy ==
Since 2007, he is featured on a Cape Verdean $500 escudos banknote.

A plaque is commemorated at his former house in Ribeira Grande. The plaque reads in Portuguese, it is translated into English as "Here Roberto Duarte Silva was born, notable Cape Verdean chemist, 1837-1889".
