= Association theory =

Theory in chemistry

Association theory (also aggregate theory) is a theory first advanced by chemist Thomas Graham in 1861 to describe the molecular structure of colloidal substances such as cellulose and starch, now understood to be polymers.

Association theory postulates that such materials are solely composed of a collection of smaller molecules bound together by an unknown force. Graham termed these materials colloids. Prior to the development of macromolecular theory by Hermann Staudinger in the 1920s, which stated that individual polymers are composed of chains of covalently bonded monomers, association theory remained the most prevalent model of polymer structure in the scientific community.

Importantly, although polymers consist of long chains of covalently linked molecules, the individual polymer chains can often still associate and undergo phase transitions and phase separation to form colloids, liquid crystals, solid crystals, or aggregates. For biopolymers, association leads to formation of biomolecular condensates, micelles and other examples of molecular self-assembly.

== Bibliography ==
- Morawetz, Herbert Polymers: The Origins and Growth of a Science John Wiley and Sons, 1985.
- Utracki, L. A. Commercial Polymer Blends London: Chapman and Hall, 1998.
- https://books.google.com/books?id=aLrrCAAAQBAJ&pg=PA14
