= Roberto Duarte (conductor) =

Brazilian conductor, pianist, musicologist (born 1941)

Roberto Ricardo Duarte (born 26 December 1941 in Rio de Janeiro) is a Brazilian conductor, pianist, and musicologist, known particularly for his international promotion of Brazilian music.

== Biography ==
=== Education ===
Duarte holds a degree in law from the Fluminense Federal University, a degree in piano performance from the Conservatório de Música de Niterói, and degrees in composition and conducting from the Escola de Música da Universidade Federal do Rio de Janeiro. Among his conducting mentors were Francisco Mignone and Eleazar de Carvalho. Duarte is also a member of the Academia Brasileira de Música.

=== Career ===
Duarte became well-known primarily after winning the 1975 Serge Koussevitzky International Conducting Competition. Since then, he has conducted dozens of orchestras in Brazil and Europe, including the Tonhalle Orchester Zürich, the Moscow Chamber Orchestra, and the Slovak Symphony Orchestra, the latter with which he has released several recordings. He has also been the principal conductor of the Orquestra Sinfônica do Paraná and the Orquestra Unisinos of São Leopoldo. Most of the music Duarte chooses to conduct is by Heitor Villa-Lobos and other prominent Brazilian composers.

Duarte has also released new editions of some of Villa-Lobos's orchestral works, including the Descobrimiento do Brasil suites and Rudá.

In addition, Duarte was a professor of conducting at the Escola de Música da Universidade Federal do Rio de Janeiro for almost 30 years, serving as the conductor of that institution's main symphony orchestra. He has given lectures at various other music schools as well.

=== Awards ===
In 1996, Duarte was awarded the Prêmio Nacional da Música by the Brazilian government. In addition, the Associação Paulista de Críticos de Arte gave him the Best Conductor of the Year Award in both 1994 and 1997, as well as the Carlos Gomes Prize for opera conducting in 2001.
