= François-Antoine Jecker =

French scientific-instrument maker

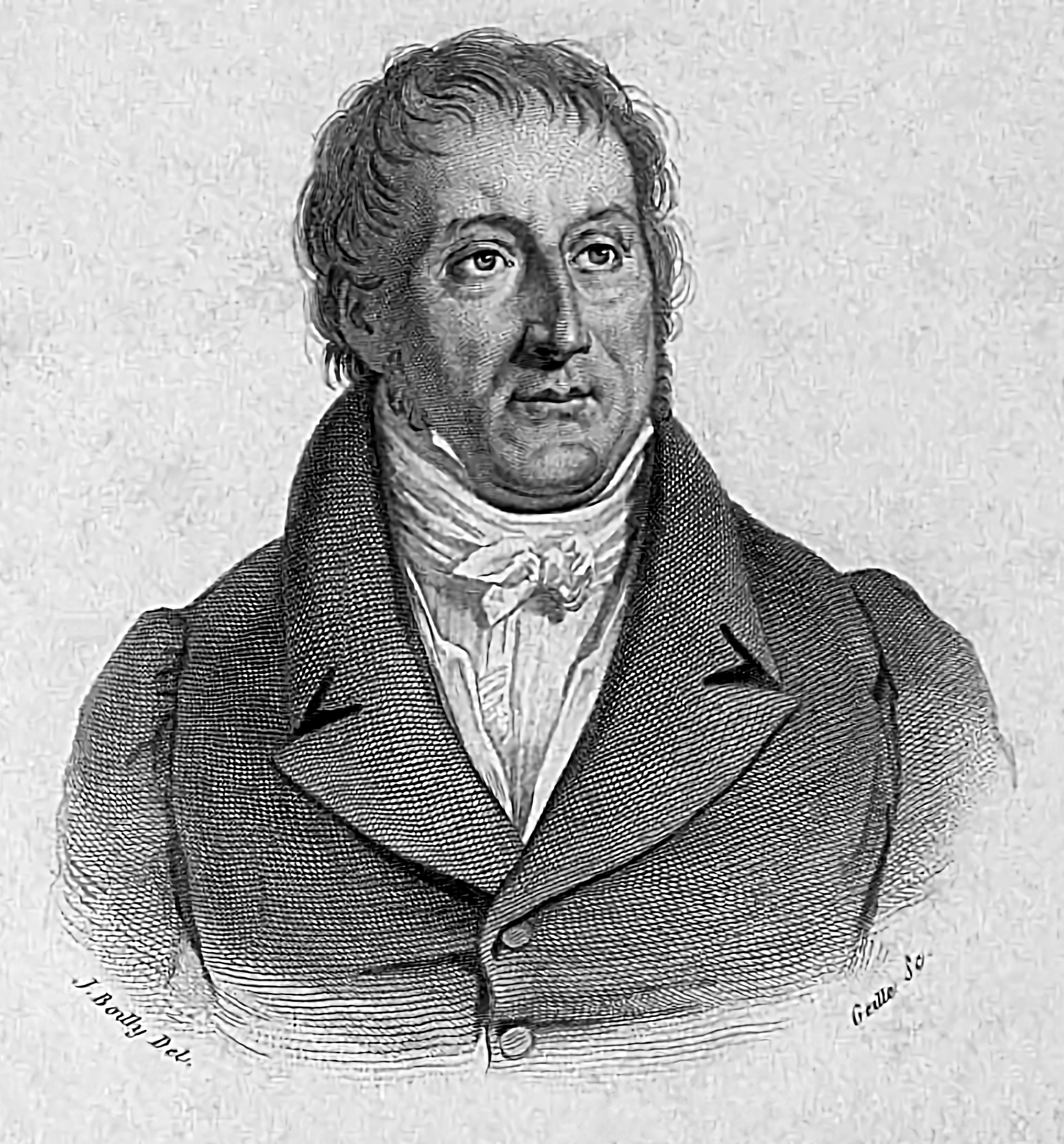

François-Antoine Jecker (November 14, 1765 – September 30, 1834) was a French scientific-instrument maker. Trained in London under Jesse Ramsden, he established a workshop in Paris that produced astronomical, optical, and measuring instruments.

== Life and work ==
Jecker was born in Hirtzfelden near Colmar, Haut-Rhin, the son of a farmer. His brother Laurenz Jecker (1769–1834) became a needle manufacturer. He apprenticed with a watchmaker in Besançon where two uncles worked as musicians. He went to London in 1786 and trained with Jesse Ramsden and returned to Paris in 1792 where he started a workshop to manufacture astronomical instruments and precision measuring instruments. He was joined by his brothers Gervais and Protais and by 1800 he had nearly 40 employees.
