= Charles Moureu =

French chemist (1863–1929)

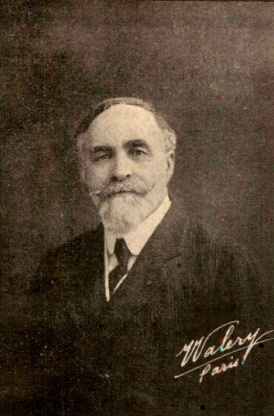
- Born: François Charles Léon Moureu; 19 April 1863; Mourenx, Basses-Pyrénées, France
- Died: 13 June 1929 (aged 66); Biarritz, France
- Education: École supérieure de Pharmacie, Paris
- Known for: IUPAC
- Spouse: Louise Anne Paquignon
- Children: Henri Moureu
- Scientific career
- Workplaces: École pratique des hautes études, Collège de France, Collège de France

François Charles Léon Moureu (19 April 1863, in Mourenx – 13 June 1929, in Biarritz) was a French organic chemist and pharmacist. In 1902 Charles Moureu published Notions fondamentales de chimie organique, translated into English as Fundamental principles of organic chemistry (1921).

During World War I, Charles Moureu was vice-chairman of France's Committee for Gas Warfare. In this role, he established 16 chemistry laboratories in Paris, supervising their work until 1918. Moureu also became chairman of the Committee of National Defence when it was established in 1925, leading it until his death in 1929. During the war, he researched acrolein and sulfur mustard gas, working with Charles Dufraisse. This work led them to pioneering research into autoxidation and antioxidants.

Moureu supported initiatives for international cooperation and standardization among chemists. He was one of the vice-presidents of the Société chimique de France (SCF) in 1910, and the founding President of the International Union of Pure and Applied Chemistry (IUPAC) from 1920 to 1922.

== Education ==
Charles Moureu attended school in Bayonne. At 17, he apprenticed with his older brother, Félix Moureu, in his brother's pharmacy in Biarritz, in preparation for studies in pharmacy.

From 1884 to 1891 Moureu studied at the École Supérieure de Pharmacie in Paris. He received the school's silver medal in 1886, and both its gold medal and the Laillet Prize in 1887. In addition, he interned in the Hôpitaux de Paris from 1886 to 1891, where he was given first place rank of the interns in 1887 and in 1889.

Moureu received a degree in 1888 and graduated as a pharmacist first class in 1891, whereupon he was given a position as chief pharmacist of the public asylum of the Seine (des Asiles de la Seine). He remained in this position from 1891 to 1907. This allowed him to continue his research, studying organic chemistry with Auguste Béhal and Charles Friedel. He received his doctorate in physical sciences in 1893 from the Sorbonne, with the dissertation Contribution à l'étude de l'acide acrylique et de ses dérivés (Contribution to the study of acrylic acid and its derivatives). He obtained his agrégation in 1899.

== Career ==
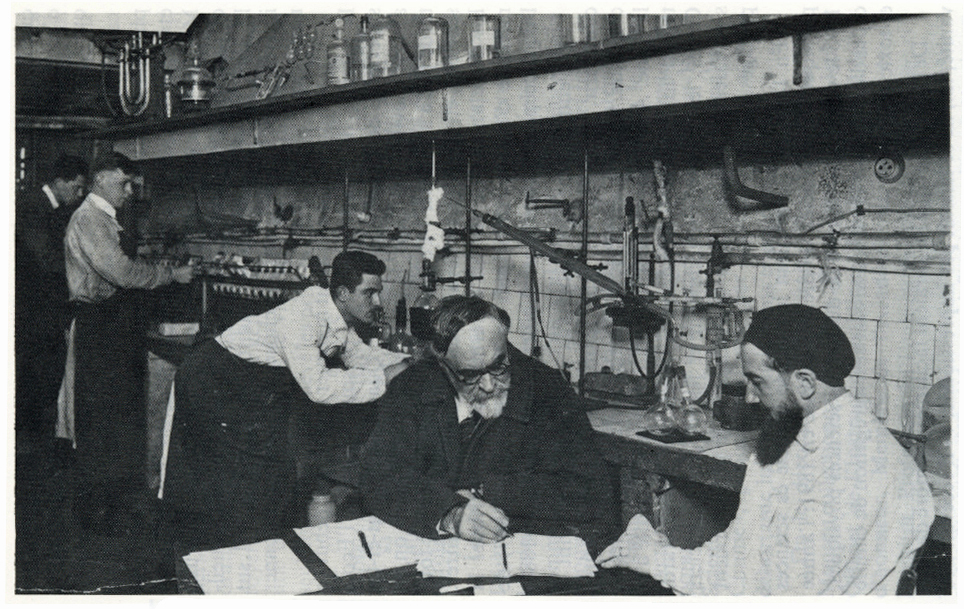
Moureu and Charles Dufraisse in their laboratory in Paris

From 1907 onward, Charles Moureu was a professor of chemical pharmacy at the École supérieure de Pharmacie in Paris. In 1913 he was named director of the laboratory of hydrological physical chemistry at the École pratique des hautes études. He became a member of the Académie Nationale de Médecine (from 1907), Académie des sciences (from 1911) and Académie nationale de pharmacie (president 1913).

After the use of poison gas against French troops in the Second Battle of Ypres on April 22, 1915, Charles Moureu was appointed vice-chairman of France's Committee for Gas Warfare. Moreu headed the Section des produits agressifs (Aggressive Products Section). In this role, he was responsible for 16 chemistry laboratories in Paris, supervising and coordinating their work until 1918. He was also involved in conferences of the allied powers in September 1917, March 1918, and October 1918.

In 1917 Charles Moureu was appointed professor of organic chemistry at the Collège de France. Succeeding Émile Jungfleisch, Moureu was the only professor to be appointed to the college during the first world war.

Moureu supported initiatives for international cooperation and standardization among chemists. He served as a vice-president of the Société chimique de France (SCF) in 1910. Moureu was active in the restructuring of chemical organizations in 1918–1919. The Allied Conference of Academies formally dissolved the International Association of Chemical Societies (IACS), as of July 22, 1919. Moureu was the founding President of the International Union of Pure and Applied Chemistry (IUPAC), holding the position from 1920 to 1922. He also supported the establishment of the Maison de la chimie in Paris as an international center for chemists.

In 1921 and 1922, Moureu visited the United States as a scientific expert. In 1921 he was part of a French Mission on Disarmament. In 1922, he visited Washington, D.C. for discussions on the use of gas in warfare. He visited a number of universities in the United States and Canada, and was given an honorary degree by the University of Montreal. Moureu became chairman of the French Committee of National Defence when it was established in 1925, leading it until his death in 1929.

== Research ==
Moureu was widely respected for his research work. As part of his research on acrylic acid and its derivatives, he was the first to synthesize acrylonitrile in 1893. In addition, he studied acetylene compounds, phenolic compounds, plant essences, and rare gases found in wells and mines.

During the war, Moureu researched acrolein and sulfur mustard gas, working with his student Charles Dufraisse. Acrolein was an extremely unstable compound, which tended to polymerize on contact with air. Already familiar with the preparation of acrolein, Moureu and Dufraisse were able to develop a way to stabilize it after carefully studying the processes by which it altered. Their work led to the use of acrolein and later benzyl iodide in weapons.

Their research also had great impact and long-lasting significance after the war. It was first published in the Bulletin of the Chemical Society of France in 1922. The autoxidation reactions that Moureu and Dufraisse described occur spontaneously in most organic products in the presence of oxygen from the air and certain catalysts. Autoxidation affects virtually all living organisms. Moureu identified catalysts that could trigger such reactions, and other compounds that could slow or inhibit such reactions. He called the inhibitors "antioxygens", now known as "antioxidants". Moureu is best known for this pioneering research. It has led to the use of antioxidants in the rubber and vegetable oil industries, and to widespread applications in foods and medicines. Antioxidants are added to slow the spoiling of foods and the aging of rubber.

Moureu's work with sulfur mustard also became important after the war, as later researchers realized that some of the chemicals that were in mustard gas could be used as anti-cancer drugs, suppressing the division and proliferation of blood and bone marrow cells in leukaemia and lymphatic tumours.

With Adolphe Lepape, Moureu studied rare gases including krypton and xenon. He developed methods for analyzing the gaseous components of mineral springs, and carried out comparative analyses of at least 108 springs.

== Death ==
Charles Moureu died on June 13, 1929. Subscribers funded the creation of a monument in his honor in the Parc Beaumont in Pau in 1933. The bust was sculpted by Ernest Gabard. Further celebrations were held in Pau and Mourenx on the centenary of his birthday in 1963.

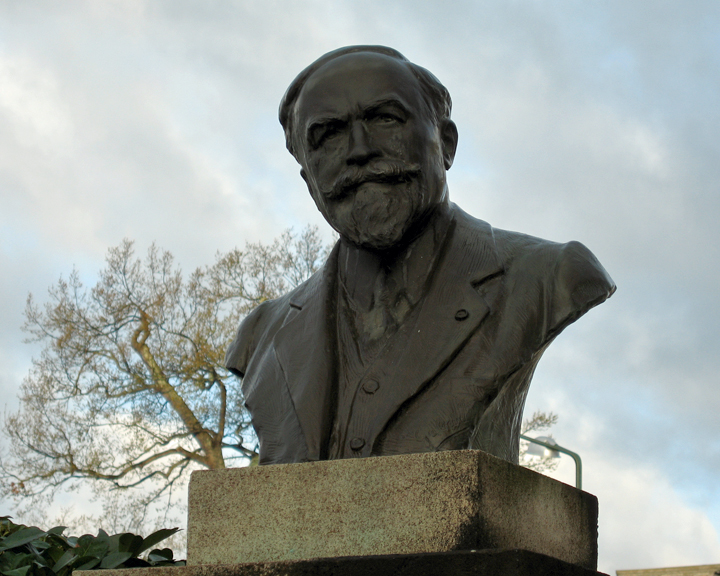
Monument, Parc Beaumont, Pau, by Ernest Gabard

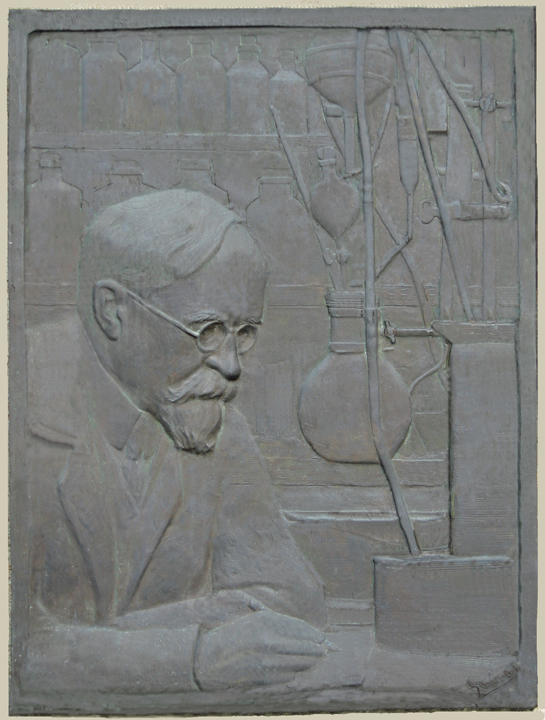
Commemorative Plaque

== Selected works ==
Published books by Moureu include:

- Contribution à l'étude de l'acide acrylique et de ses dérivés. Paris: Gauthier-Villars. 1893. (doctoral thesis, Contribution to the study of acrylic acid and its derivatives)
- Les Azols, conférence faite au laboratoire de M. Friedel. Paris: G. Carré. 1894. (The azoles, lecture delivered at the laboratory of Charles Friedel)
- Étude théorique sur les composés pyridiques et hydropyridiques. Paris: G. Carré. 1894. (Theoretical study of pyridine compounds and hydropyridines)
- Notions fondamentales de chimie organique (1st ed.). Paris: Gauthier-Villars. 1902. Translated into English as Fundamental principles of organic chemistry. Translated by Braunholtz, Walter T. K. London: G. Bell and sons, Ltd. 1921.
- La chimie et la guerre, science et avenir. Paris: Masson et cie. 1920. (Chemistry and war: science and the future)
- Discours et conférences sur la science et ses applications. Paris: Gauthier-Villars. 1927. (Speeches and lectures on science and its applications)

Published papers include:

- Moureu, Charles; Dufraisse, Charles (1925). "I.—The so-called poisoning of oxidising catalysts". J. Chem. Soc., Trans. 127: 1–4. doi:10.1039/CT9252700001.
- Moureu, Charles; Dufraisse, Charles (July 1926). "Catalysis and Auto-Oxidation. Anti-Oxygenic and Pro-Oxygenic Activity". Chemical Reviews. 3 (2): 113–162. doi:10.1021/cr60010a001.

== See also ==
- Moureu–Mignonac ketimine synthesis
