= Jean Baptiste Jecker =

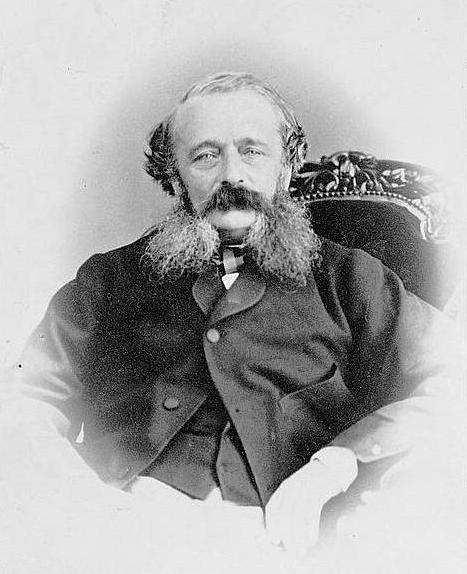

Jean Baptiste Jecker (December 29, 1812 – May 26, 1871) was a Swiss-French banker and businessman who established a bank in Mexico. He precipitated the Second French intervention in Mexico in 1861 following the issue of so-called "Jecker Bonds" to service the debts of the Mexican government of Miguel Miramón which led to the bankruptcy of his enterprise.

== Life and work ==
Jecker was born in Porrentruy, in the Vaud canton, to a miller. His brother Louis-Joseph Jecker (1801–1851) became a surgeon in Mexico and later chemist who established the Jecker Prize. Jecker moved to Paris in 1831 and worked with the Hottinger bank and in 1835 he moved to Mexico where he began to prospect for mining in Sonora and Baja California. Between 1840 and 1844 he acted as an agent of the Montgomery, Nicod and MN&C Company which lent money. It lent 2 million pesos to the Mexican government in 1840. In 1844 this company closed and left Jecker to liquidate its assets and debts. He established an institution called Casa Jecker, Torre, and Company in association with Isidro de la Torre and Felipe Alonso Terán. His brother also apparently lent 300000 pesos. In 1851 he promoted the Arizona Mina Restoring Company in which the French ambassador André Levasseur, the Mexican president Mariano Arista and the governor of Sonora José de Aguilar invested. This venture was thwarted by fights with the Apaches and they were defeated in 1852. Other French investors including Count Gastón Raousset-Boulbon and Patrice Dillon, Consul of France in San Francisco were also involved and they sought payments for the losses. In 1853 the Jecker company collaborated with Manuel Escandón to establish a bank. In 1854 the bank tried to gain more land in Sonora. De la Torre broke away and the company was named Casa Juan B. Jecker and Company. In 1859 he made a deal with the conservative Miguel Miramón to convert debt of fifteen million pesos into bonds which later came to be called "Jecker bonds". In 1860 Jecker's bank declared bankruptcy following the victory of the Liberal Benito Juárez over the Conservatives. The land that had been handed to Jecker by the Miramon government was said to be in violation and Jecker no longer had rights on it. Jecker tried to sue the Mexican government and tried to bring the French government to support him. The Duke of Morny, a relative of Napoleon III, offered support if he would be paid 30% of the recovered amounts. The Jecker bonds were then made into a French claim. France sent some troops to Mexico but they were withdrawn in 1867. The Duke of Morny died in 1865 and Napoleon III was overthrown by the Paris Commune in 1871 and Jecker tried to escape to Paris. He was arrested on 23 May 1871 and shot in La Roquette prison.
