= Paul Dauenhauer =

American chemical engineer and researcher

Lanny & Charlotte Schmidt Professor Paul J. Dauenhauer
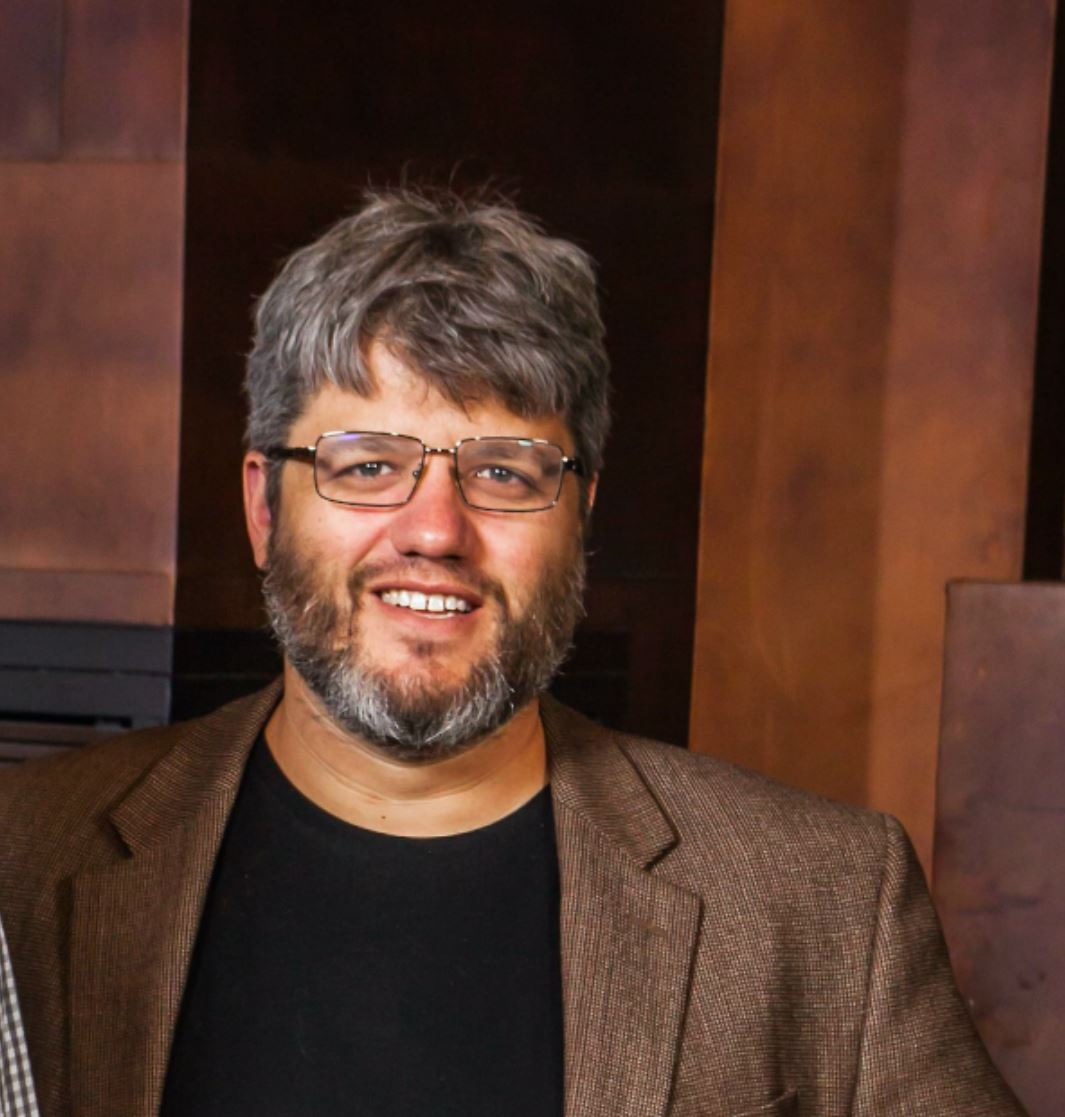
- "Paul Dauenhauer"
- Born: 1980 (age 45–46); United States
- Education: University of Wisconsin, Madison; University of Minnesota
- Known for: Catalytic resonance theory Cellulose Chemistry; Renewable Chemicals; Programmable Catalysts
- Awards: MacArthur Fellow (2020); Rutherford Aris Award (2016); Camille Dreyfus Teacher-Scholar (2014)
- Scientific career
- Fields: Chemical Engineer, Catalysis
- Workplaces: University of Minnesota; University of Massachusetts
- Doctoral advisor: Lanny Schmidt

External videos
- “An Ocean of Sustainable Carbon: A Future of Novel Materials from Biomass” “Beyond the Classroom: Process Chemistry”

Paul Dauenhauer (born 1980), a chemical engineer and MacArthur Fellow, is the Lanny and Charlotte Schmidt Professor at the University of Minnesota. He is recognized for his research in catalysis science and engineering, especially, his contributions to the understanding of the catalytic breakdown of cellulose to renewable chemicals, the invention of oleo-furan surfactants, and the development of catalytic resonance theory and programmable catalysts.

== Early life and education ==
Paul Dauenhauer was born in 1980 in Texas, US, and was raised in Wisconsin Rapids, Wisconsin, attending Lincoln High School. He received his bachelor's degree in chemical engineering and chemistry at the University of Wisconsin, Madison in 2004. Working under the supervision of Lanny Schmidt at the University of Minnesota, Dauenhauer received his PhD in chemical engineering in 2008 from the Department of Chemical Engineering & Materials Science. His dissertation described the development of reactive flash volatilization and was titled "Millisecond autothermal catalytic reforming of carbohydrates for synthetic fuels by reactive flash volatilization".

== Career ==
Following graduation from Minnesota, Dauenhauer served as a senior research engineer at the Dow Chemical Company in Midland, MI, and Freeport, TX. He started as an assistant professor at the University of Massachusetts, Amherst in 2009 before promotion to associate professor in 2014. In 2014, he moved to the Department of Chemical Engineering & Materials Science (CEMS) at the University of Minnesota, where he was promoted to professor, and then appointed Lanny Schmidt Honorary Professor in 2019. During this time, he co-founded or contributed to the founding of startup companies Activated Research Company, Sironix Renewables, and enVerde, LLC.

=== Renewable chemicals ===
Dauenhauer's focus on renewable chemicals produced from glucose has targeted both drop-in replacement chemicals and new chemicals with novel characteristics. In 2012, he discovered a high yield pathway to synthesize p-xylene from glucose; this molecule is the key ingredient in polyethylene terephthalate plastic. This process technology utilized a new class of weak acid zeolites that permits the manufacture of biorenewable polyester.

In 2015, Dauenhauer and his team developed a new class of surfactants, detergents, and soaps that are derived from biomass (furans from sugars and fatty acids from triglycerides), oleo-furan sulfonates (OFS). These molecules were shown to have high hard water stability (>1000 ppm Ca++) and are being commercialized by Sironix Renewables, Inc.

In 2016, Dauenhauer and Abdelrahman developed the acid-catalyzed dehydra-decyclization mechanism that simultaneously opens cyclic ether rings and dehydrates to synthesize diene products. This technology was subsequently used to optimize the catalytic production of isoprene, the key chemical in the production of car tires. Subsequent research identified pathways to similarly convert biomass-derived tetrahydrofuran to butadiene and 2-methyl-tetrahydrofuran to piperylene.

In 2022, Dauenhauer and his laboratory invented a highly selective catalytic technology of amine-modified zeolites to convert lactic acid esters to acrylic acid. This technology enables the use of existing processes to convert maize (i.e., corn) to lactic acid as upstream feedstock providers for biorenewable acrylic acid and acrylates, which are the key ingredient in products such as paints, coatings, and diapers. This catalyst formulation was patented and is the foundational technology for the formation of Lakril Technologies, a startup company in Chicago, IL.

Key publications include:

- C.L. Williams, C.C. Chang, P. Do, N. Nikbin, S. Caratzoulas, D.G. Vlachos, R.F. Lobo, W. Fan, P.J. Dauenhauer "Cycloaddition of Biomass-Derived Furans for Catalytic Production of Renewable p-Xylene", ACS Catalysis, 2, 6, 935–939, (2012).
- Dae Sung Park, Kristeen E. Joseph, Maura Koehle, Christoph Krumm, Limin Ren, Jonathan N. Damen, Meera H. Shete, Han Seung Lee, Xiaobing Zuo, Byeongdu Lee, Wei Fan, Dionisios G. Vlachos, Raul F. Lobo, Michael Tsapatsis, Paul Dauenhauer "Tunable Oleo-Furan Surfactants by Acylation of Renewable Furans", ACS Central Science, 2(11), 820–824, (2016).
- Omar A. Abdelrahman, Dae Sung Park, Katherine P Vinter, Charles S. Spanjers, Limin Ren, Hong Je Cho, Kechun Zhang, Wei Fan, Michael Tsapatsis, Paul J. Dauenhauer "Renewable Isoprene by Sequential Hydrogenation of Itaconic Acid and Dehydra-Decyclization of 3-Methyl-Tetrahydrofuran", ACS Catalysis, 7(2), 1428–1431, (2016).

=== Cellulose Pyrolysis ===
Dauenhauer's study of cellulose in 2008 led to the discovery of an intermediate liquid state of short-chain cellulose oligomers of sub-second duration at temperatures around 500 deg C. He further outlined the challenges in understanding high temperature cellulose chemistry by publishing his "Top Ten Challenges" of biomass pyrolysis in 2012, one of which was based on his discovery of the mechanism of aerosol formation through liquid intermediate cellulose.

Dauenhauer's team further developed a new reactor technique called 'PHASR' (Pulse-Heated Analysis of Solid Reactions) which led to the first isothermal kinetics of cellulose conversion and product formation. This technique permitted a molecular analysis of cellulose activation and the discovery that cellulose has a unique reaction transition at 467 deg C. The high temperature kinetic transition was attributed to the catalytic role of chain-to-chain cellulose hydroxyl groups in stabilizing the chain fragmentation of inter-monomer bonds.

Key publications include:

- Vineet Maliekkal, Saurabh Maduskar, Derek J. Saxon, Mohammadreza Nasiri, Theresa M. Reineke, Matthew Neurock, Paul Dauenhauer "Activation of Cellulose via Cooperative Hydroxyl-Catalyzed Transglycosylation of Glycosidic Bonds", ACS Catalysis, 9(3), 1943–1955, (2019).
- Andrew R. Teixeira, Kyle G. Mooney, Jacob S. Kruger, C. Luke Williams, Wieslaw J. Suszynski, Lanny D. Schmidt, David P. Schmidt, and Paul J. Dauenhauer "Aerosol generation by reactive boiling ejection of molten cellulose", Energy & Environmental Science, 4, 4306–4321, (2011).

=== Catalytic Resonance Theory ===
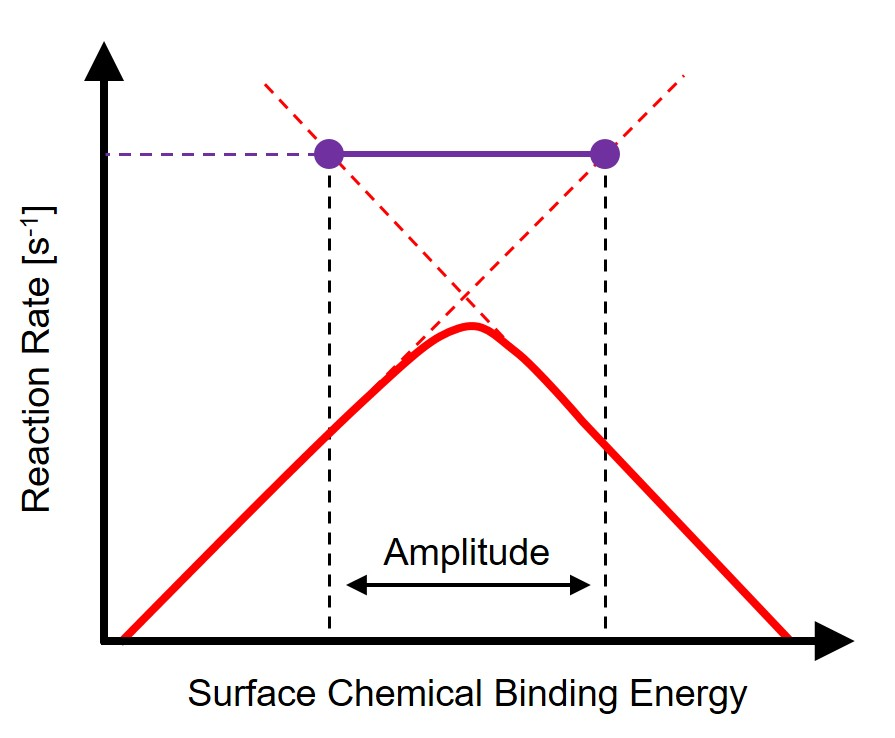
Oscillation of surface binding energy on a Sabatier volcano plot (red) at resonance conditions occurs at the tie line (purple) for maximum average reaction rate

Catalytic resonance theory was proposed by Dauenhauer based on the Sabatier principle of catalysis developed by French chemist Paul Sabatier. Optimal catalyst performance is depicted as a 'volcano' peak using a descriptor of the chemical reaction defining different catalytic materials. Experimental evidence of the Sabatier principle was first demonstrated by Balandin in 1960. In his initial predictions of the behavior of oscillating chemical reactions on metal surfaces, Dauenhauer showed through microkinetic modeling that steady state reaction rates could theoretically achieve chemical reaction speeds as much as 1000 times greater than previously achievable rates, even with optimized catalytic systems. This modeling work broke down surface chemical reactions into its component parts and associated natural frequencies, which could be matched to resonate with the catalytic surface frequencies.

Follow-up work on catalytic resonance theory by Dauenhauer and his team broadened to understand the relationship between surface chemistry with its linear scaling relationships and the surface binding energy oscillation waveform. He introduced the concept of superVolcanoes as a superposition of all possible Sabatier volcanoes for varying linear scaling parameters, before further connecting the behavior of oscillating catalytic surfaces to molecular machines and pumps.

Key publications include:

- A. Ardagh, O. Abdelrahman, P.J. Dauenhauer "Principles of Dynamic Heterogeneous Catalysis: Surface Resonance and Turnover Frequency Response", ACS Catalysis, 9(8), 6929–6937, (2019).
- A. Ardagh, T. Birol, Q. Zhang, O. Abdelrahman, P.J. Dauenhauer "Catalytic Resonance Theory: superVolcanoes, catalytic molecular pumps, and oscillatory steady state", Catalysis Science & Technology, 9, 5058–5076, (2019).
- M.A. Ardagh, M. Shetty, A. Kuznetsov, Q. Zhang, P. Christopher, D.G. Vlachos, O.A. Abdelrahman, P.J. Dauenhauer, "Catalytic Resonance Theory: Parallel Reaction Pathway Control", Chemical Science, 2020.

== Technology & Startup Companies ==
Paul Dauenhauer has developed multiple technologies that have been patented and licensed from the University of Minnesota to his startup companies located throughout the United States. The common theme across all startups and technologies is a focus on economic catalytic conversion for more sustainable energy and materials. Companies include:

=== Låkril Technologies ===
Låkril Technologies is a Chicago-based startup company. They aim to provide competitive alternatives to fossil fuel-derived acrylic acid and acrylates via catalytic dehydration of α-hydroxy acids (e.g., lactic acid). The core technology of Lakril Technologies is based on amine-modified zeolite catalysts invented in the Dauenhauer Laboratory at the University of Minnesota.

=== Sironix Renewables ===
Sironix develops biomass-based cleaning surfactants and detergents. The flagship detergent products are derived from chemicals that can be sourced from biomass and provide excellent cleaning performance in both hard and cold water. The active ingredient, oleo-furan sulfonate, was invented via combination of natural oil-derived fatty acids with sugar-derived furans, followed by sulfonation in a catalytic process.

=== Activated Research Company ===
Activated Research Company (ARC) develops products for chemical analysis. The company creates GC-FID (gas chromatography flame ionization detector) and LC-FID (liquid chromatography flame ionization detector) technologies that deliver data results across a diverse range of industries. The flagship product, the Polyarc detector, was developed in the Dauenhauer Laboratory at the University of Minnesota to enable simple and accurate quantification of complex chemical mixtures without calibration. ARC detectors were acquired by Shimadzu in 2024.

=== Carba ===
Carba is a Minnesota-based startup company employing biomass torrefaction for carbon sequestration. Carba's torrefaction reactor is portable, enabling modular deployment at biomass waste sources. The company aims to use the natural carbon capture ability of biomass via photosynthesis to overcome the entropic difficulty of direct air capture of carbon dioxide, and provides technology to convert biomass carbon into a more stable form.

== Advising and honors ==
External videos
- "Paul Dauenhauer, Chemical Engineering, 2020 MacArthur Fellow" "2019 ACS Sustainable Chemistry & Engineering"

Professor Dauenhauer has supervised 20 PhD students and advised ten post-doctoral scholars. He has published over 130 peer-reviewed papers and 10 patents. He has given over 50 invited seminars and lectures including the Eastman Lecture at the University of California (2021), Berkeley, the Notre Dame Thiele lecture in 2017, and the Purdue Mellichamp lecture in 2016. He has received numerous awards for his work including:

- 2025 – Maria Flytzani-Stephanopoulos Award for Creativity in Catalysis
- 2024 – Distinguished Professorship, University of Minnesota
- 2024 – Lincoln High School Wall of Fame
- 2023 – Minnesota Cup Grand Prize
- 2022 – Holtz Lecture, Johns Hopkins University
- 2022 – Marple-Schweitzer Lecture, Northwestern University
- 2021 – Blavatnik Finalist
- 2021 – Herman Pines Award
- 2021 – Dourdeville Lecture, Brown University
- 2020 – MacArthur Fellowship
- 2019 – Stratis V. Sotirchos Memorial Lectureship
- 2019 – University of Minnesota COGS, Outstanding Advisor Award
- 2019 – Department of Energy, Top Ten EFRC Invention Award
- 2019 – ACS Sustainable Chemistry and Engineering Lectureship
- 2018 – AIChE CRE Young Investigator Award
- 2017 – Thiele Lecturer – Notre Dame
- 2016 – Rutherford Aris Award for Excellence in Reaction Engineering
- 2016 – Purdue University – Mellichamp Lecturer
- 2014 – Camille Dreyfus Teacher Scholar
- 2013 – DuPont Young Professor Award
- 2013 – National Science Foundation, NSF- CAREER Award
- 2012 – US Department of Energy – Early Career Award
