= Microlith (disambiguation) =

A microlith is a small stone tool from 35,000 to about 3,000 years ago.

Microlith may also refer to:

- Microlith (catalytic reactor)

== See also ==
- Microlithography
- Microlithosia, synonym of Paralithosia, a genus of moths
