= William C. Pfefferle =

Inventor of Catalytic Combustion (1923-2010)

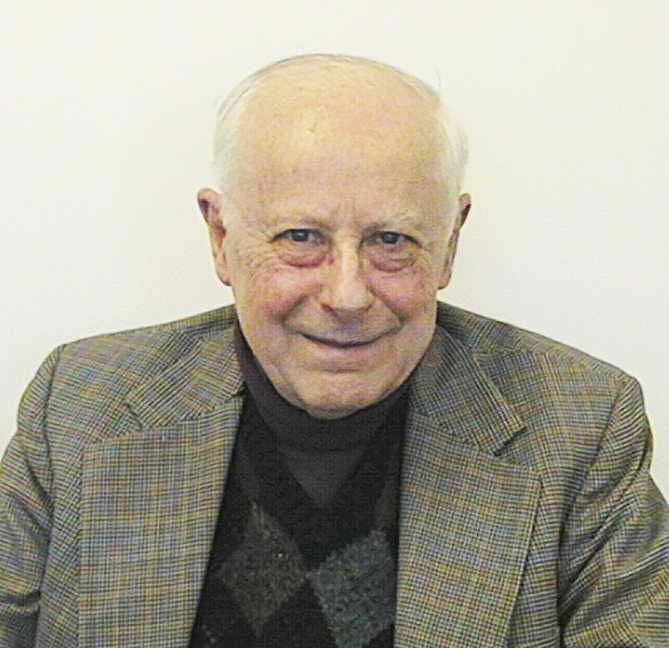
- Born: April 24, 1923; Philadelphia, Pennsylvania
- Died: December 28, 2010 (aged 87); New Haven
- Education: Drexel University
- Known for: catalytic combustion, "Magnaforming"
- Spouse: Eleanor
- Children: four including Lisa Pfefferle
- Awards: ASME Gas Turbine Award; ACS Industrial Innovation Award
- Scientific career
- Fields: Chemical engineering

William C. Pfefferle (April 24, 1923 – December 28, 2010) was an American scientist and inventor.

== Biography ==
Pfefferle studied chemical engineering at Drexel University. He took a doctorate in physical chemistry at the University of Pennsylvania.

From 1952 to 1956, he worked at Standard Oil of Indiana (now part of BP).

In 1956 he moved to Engelhard Industries, Iselin, NJ. While at Engelhard he invented "Magnaforming", a technique that now creates a large amount of the world's gasoline. He pioneered "permeation mediated catalysis" and developed phosphoric acid fuel cells.

Nicknamed the "father of catalytic combustion", Pfefferle invented the original catalytic combustor for gas turbine engines in the early 1970s. Gas turbines work by mixing fuel with compressed and heated air, which burns and generates energy to turn the turbines. Unfortunately, nitrogen oxide gases, which contribute to global warming, are emitted during this process. Pfefferle developed a process using a catalyst to allow combustion while forming minimal amounts of nitrogen oxides and carbon monoxide.

In 1977, Pfefferle founded William C. Pfefferle Associates, which he continued until 1986. He worked on several projects included a heavy oil burning downhole steam system for Dresser Industries.

In 1986, Pfefferle co-founded Precision Combustion in North Haven, Connecticut. Pfefferle helped to develop clean and efficient catalytic combustion technologies for combustion engines. He also invented the "Microlith" catalytic reactor for automobiles and fuel processing, and the RCL catalytic combustor for ground-power gas turbine machines.

Pfefferle received the American Society of Mechanical Engineers (ASME) Gas Turbine Award in 2003. Also in 2003, he received the American Chemical Society's (ACS) Industrial Innovation Award. He was survived by his wife Eleanor, whom he married in 1950.

== Honors and accolades ==
- 1990 Inductee - New Jersey Inventors Hall of Fame
- 2003 Honoree - American Chemical Society's Industrial Innovation Awards

== U.S. patents held ==
Pfefferle held over 100 patents including on two major processes, namely catalytic combustion and magnaforming:

- 3,928,961 - Catalytically Supported Thermal Combustion. This is the basic patent in a group of over ten covering technology for burning fuels in continuous combustion systems (such as gas turbines and furnaces) without formation of pollutants while improving efficiency.
- 3,392,107 - Magnaforming. This process for raising octane is now used to produce much of the world's gasoline, improving product yields and lengthening catalyst life.

Pfefferle also held numerous other patents concerning the catalytic method, combustion and related topics.

== Published work ==
- A Compact Catalytic Combustor System for Small Turbogenerators. ASME International Joint Power Conference, 1997 (with G.Kraemer, T. Strickland, and J. Ritter).
- Compact, High Efficiency Catalytic Muffler for Utility Engines, Issues in Emissions Control Technology, SAE, 1997 (with S. Etemad, R. Sun, and S. Roychoudhury).
- Development and Performance of Microlith Light-Off Preconverters for LEV/ULEV. Low Emission Vehicle Technologies, SAE, 1997 (with S. Roychoudhury, G. Muench, J. Bianchi, and F. Gonzales).
- Experimental & Modeling Results for an Advanced Gas Catalytic Combustor for Gas Turbine Engines. Third Workshop on Catalytic Combustion, AIChE, 1996 (with H. Karim and G. Kraemer).
- Catalytically Stabilized Incineration of Chlorinated Hydrocarbons. Innovative Hazardous Waste Treatment Technology Series, H. Freeman, ed., Technomic Publishing Company, 1990.
- Catalysis and Combustion. Catalysis Reviews, J. Carberry, ed., 1987 (with L.D. Pfefferle).
- Catalytically Stabilized Combustion. Prog. Energy Comb. Science, N.A. Chigier, ed., Pergamon Press, 1986 (with L.D. Pfefferle).
