= Lanny D. Schmidt =

American physical chemist (1938–2020)

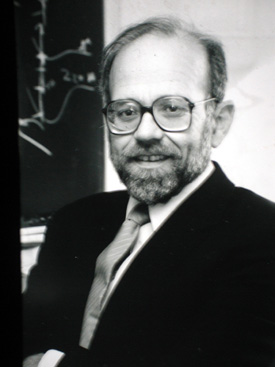
- Lanny D. Schmidt
- Born: May 6, 1938; Waukegan, Illinois, U.S.
- Died: March 27, 2020 (aged 81)
- Education: University of Chicago; Wheaton College
- Known for: Catalytic Partial Oxidation reactive flash volatilization, millisecond reactors, detailed balance chemistry, and thermochemical biomass conversion.
- Awards: Humboldt Prize (Germany, 1994); National Academy of Engineering (1994); Parravano Award (Michigan Catalysis Society, 1987); Neal R. Amundson Award for Excellence in Chemical Reaction Engineering (2013)
- Scientific career
- Fields: Chemistry, chemical engineering
- Workplaces: University of Minnesota
- Doctoral advisor: Robert Gomer
- Notable students: Yannís G. Kevrekidis, Raymond Gorte, Bob McCabe, Maria Flytzani-Stephanopoulos, Dionisios Vlachos, Paul Dauenhauer

External videos
- “Voices of Excellence: Students, Faculty and Alumni of CEMS”

External videos
- “CEMS UMN Perspectives with Lanny D. Schmidt, Regents Professor Emeritus”

Lanny D. Schmidt (May 6, 1938 – March 27, 2020) was an American chemist, inventor, author, and Regents Professor of Chemical Engineering and Materials Science at the University of Minnesota. He is well known for his extensive work in surface science, detailed chemistry (microkinetics), chemical reaction engineering, catalysis, and renewable energy. He is also well known for mentoring over a hundred graduate students and his work on millisecond reactors and reactive flash volatilization.

== Education and research ==
Born in Waukegan, Illinois, Schmidt received a Bachelor of Science degree in chemistry in 1960 from Wheaton College in Wheaton, Illinois. From 1960 to 1964, he attended the University of Chicago, where he received a Ph.D. degree in physical chemistry and was awarded a National Science Foundation Graduate Fellowship. Among many research endeavors, his thesis on alkali metal adsorption was supervised by Robert Gomer. In 1965, he completed a postdoctoral year at the University of Chicago.

=== Research at Minnesota ===
In 1965, he joined the chemical engineering department at the University of Minnesota as an assistant professor in the department of chemical engineering and materials science. Schmidt's research focused on various aspects of the chemistry and engineering of chemical reactions on solid surfaces. Reaction systems of recent interest are catalytic combustion processes to produce products such as syngas, olefins, and oxygenates by partial oxidation, NOx removal, and incineration by total oxidation. One topic of his research is the characterization of adsorption and reactions on well-defined single-crystal surfaces. A second research topic is steady-state and transient reaction kinetics under conditions from ultrahigh vacuum to atmospheric pressure. Schmidt also researched catalytic reaction engineering, in which detailed models of reactors are constructed to simulate industrial reactor performance, with particular emphasis on chemical synthesis and on catalytic combustion.

=== Millisecond reactors ===
Schmidt's research since the early 1990s has focused on the catalytic partial oxidation of alkanes (particularly methane) and oxygenates in continuous flow fixed bed supported catalyst reactors. In 2004, Schmidt and his graduate students demonstrated that biomass-derived ethanol could be converted to molecular hydrogen for fuel cell at greater than 100% selectivity. The significant potential of this discovery has been well-described:

There is, however, a better way of storing the hydrogen needed for fuel cells: in ethanol, each molecule of which bundles six hydrogen atoms, two carbon atoms, and one oxygen atom into a package far more compact than gaseous hydrogen. Until recently, no one could figure out how to unbundle the ethanol molecules in an energy-efficient way. But Lanny Schmidt, a chemical engineer at the University of Minnesota, may now have found a silver bullet. He has developed a glass tube containing a series of metal plates about the size of a Bic lighter. Made out of the exotic metals rhodium and cerium, these plates can suck the hydrogen out of ethanol and feed it into a fuel cell. (Ironically, Schmidt had been looking for a catalyst that would strip hydrogen from plain old gasoline, but the ethanol turned out to work even better.)" — Sam Jaffe, Washington Monthly

The discovery has been referenced over 200 times, and it led to Schmidt being listed among the Scientific American top 50 researchers of 2004.

== Academic accomplishments ==
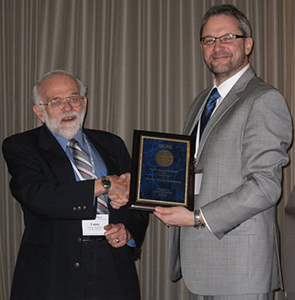
Lanny Schmidt receives the Neal R. Amundson Award at the North American Symposium on Chemical Reaction Engineering.

Schmidt has published over 350 papers in refereed journals and was a member of the National Academy of Engineering. He has supervised approximately 90 Ph.D. theses and 15 M.S. theses at Minnesota, and 14 of his former students hold university teaching positions including Maria Flytzani-Stephanopoulos, Raymond Gorte and Dionisios Vlachos. In 2013, he was awarded the Neal R. Amundson Award at the 3rd North American Symposium on Chemical Reaction Engineering. Schmidt has previously been awarded the Parravano Award (1997) by the Michigan Catalysis Society, the Alpha Xi Sigma Award (1993) by the American Institute of Chemical Engineers, and a Humboldt Prize (1994) from Germany. He has been honored by several institutions through supported lectures including the Reilly Lectures (1990) at Notre Dame, the Dodge Lectures (1992) at Yale University, the Mason Lectures (1996) at Stanford University, the Merck Lecture (1997) at Rutgers University, the Centennial Lecture (1997) at Purdue University, the Schiut Lecture (1997) at the University of Delaware and the Hottell Lecture (1999) at MIT. In 2000, he was a plenary speaker at the International Congress on Catalysis in Spain, and in 1998 he served as the Fairchild Scholar at the California Institute of Technology.

== Policy and public service ==
Throughout his career, Schmidt has promoted the importance of reaction engineering to chemical engineering and chemistry as a separate discipline. In 2004, he published the second edition of his best-selling textbook, The Engineering of Chemical Reactions, which stressed the importance of the relationships between thermodynamics, kinetics, and transport phenomena for a full understanding of reactor design.

Since 2003, Schmidt has been a strong advocate of biomass-derived energy and a supporter of biomass processing research as a solution to the decreasing petroleum supply. He frequently argued that thermochemical (non-biological) biomass conversion processes have significant advantages over biological processes that will eventually permit small-scale, highly efficient biomass-to-fuel chemical plants.

== Achievements and key publications ==
Schmidt has authored the following journal articles describing significant advances in chemical reaction engineering:

- Hickman, D. A.; Schmidt, L. D. (1993). "Production of Syngas by Direct Catalytic Oxidation of Methane". Science. 259 (5093): 343–346. Bibcode:1993Sci...259..343H. doi:10.1126/science.259.5093.343. PMID 17832347. S2CID 9988979.
- Bodke, A. S.; Olschki, D. A.; Schmidt, L. D.; Ranzi, E. (1999). "High Selectivities to Ethylene by Partial Oxidation of Ethane". Science. 285 (5428): 712–715. doi:10.1126/science.285.5428.712. PMID 10426988.
- Renewable Hydrogen from Ethanol by Autothermal Reforming.
- Salge, J. R.; Dreyer, B. J.; Dauenhauer, P. J.; Schmidt, L. D. (2006). "Renewable Hydrogen from Nonvolatile Fuels by Reactive Flash Volatilization". Science. 314 (5800): 801–804. Bibcode:2006Sci...314..801S. doi:10.1126/science.1131244. PMID 17082454. S2CID 24891756.
