= Lisa Pfefferle =

American professor of engineering

- Education: University of Pennsylvania
- Scientific career
- Thesis: Stability, ignition and pollutant formation characteristics of combustion in a thermally stabilized plug-flow burner (1984)

Lisa Diane Pfefferle is the C. Baldwin Sawyer Chair of Engineering at Yale University. She is known for her research on combustion and chemical reactions.

== Early life and education ==
Lisa Pfefferle is the daughter of chemist and inventor, William C. Pfefferle. She grew up in Middleton where she helped found a club studying pollution. She was an undergraduate at Princeton University, and earned her Ph.D. from the University of Pennsylvania in 1984.

== Career ==
Pfefferle started at Yale University as an assistant professor in 1983. In 1997 she was promoted to full professor thereby becoming the first female full professor in engineering at Yale University. Pfeffrle was appointed the C. Baldwin Sawyer Chair of Engineering at Yale University in 2009.

== Research ==
Pfefferle's primary research spans the general areas of combustion kinetics and chemical reaction engineering. This research has focused on catalytically stabilized hydrocarbon fuels and the analysis of the hydrocarbon chemistry in flames. She has studied the mechanisms of soot formation. Her collaborative research includes the incineration of toxic wastes, laser-based diagnostics for chemically reacting flow systems, and the synthesis of aligned carbon nanotubes including their relevance for the development of novel cancer immunotherapies.

== Honors and awards ==
In 1987 Pfefferle received a Presidential Young Investigator Award. Pfefferle was elected to the Connecticut Academy of Science and Engineering in 2010, and the Connecticut Technology Council honored Pferfferle in 2011.

== Selected publications ==
- Pfefferle, L. D.; Pfefferle, W. C. (1987). "Catalysis in Combustion". Catalysis Reviews. 29 (2–3): 219–267. doi:10.1080/01614948708078071. ISSN 0161-4940.
- Ciuparu, Dragos; Klie, Robert F.; Zhu, Yimei; Pfefferle, Lisa (2004-04-01). "Synthesis of Pure Boron Single-Wall Nanotubes". The Journal of Physical Chemistry B. 108 (13): 3967–3969. doi:10.1021/jp049301b. ISSN 1520-6106.
- Mcenally, C; Pfefferle, L (2007). "Improved sooting tendency measurements for aromatic hydrocarbons and their implications for naphthalene formation pathways". Combustion and Flame. 148 (4): 210–222. doi:10.1016/j.combustflame.2006.11.003.
- Kang, Seoktae; Pinault, Mathieu; Pfefferle, Lisa D.; Elimelech, Menachem (2007-08-01). "Single-Walled Carbon Nanotubes Exhibit Strong Antimicrobial Activity". Langmuir. 23 (17): 8670–8673. doi:10.1021/la701067r. ISSN 0743-7463.
- McEnally, Charles S.; Pfefferle, Lisa D. (2011-03-15). "Sooting Tendencies of Oxygenated Hydrocarbons in Laboratory-Scale Flames". Environmental Science & Technology. 45 (6): 2498–2503. doi:10.1021/es103733q. ISSN 0013-936X.

== Personal life ==
Pfefferle's father, William C. Pfefferle, was also an engineer.
