= Microlith (catalytic reactor) =

Brand of catalytic reactor

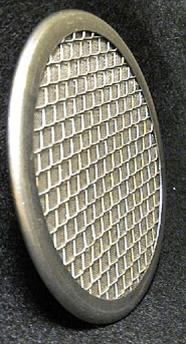
Close-up of a Microlith screen

Microlith is a brand of catalytic reactor invented by engineer William C. Pfefferle.

== Technology ==
A catalyst is a substance that speeds a reaction but that itself is left in its original state after the reaction, so that it can assist in the reaction of a large quantity of material over a long period of time. A Microlith reactor is constructed with a very thin metal substrate coated with a variety of materials including catalysts to speed reactions, and adsorbent materials for use in filters. The substrate has short channels (0.001–0.020 in) which resemble screens or meshes. This results in a lower pressure drop than other reactors and allows for high cell density and low thermal mass. Mass and heat transfer are significantly increased, allowing faster reactor response to gas temperatures and improved rates of reactant contact with the surface. By passing an electric current through the metal substrate, the Microlith can be heated rapidly and efficiently. Over 12 Microlith related US patents have been issued.

== Applications ==
- Fuel reforming
- Fuel processing
- Catalytic combustion
- Regenerable contaminant adsorbers
- Contaminant oxidizers
- Automotive catalytic converters
- Infrared generators for aerial targets
