= Maria Flytzani-Stephanopoulos =

American chemical engineer (1950–2019)

Distinguished Professor Maria Flytzani-Stephanopoulos
- Born: 1950; Kalamata, Greece
- Died: October 28, 2019 (aged 68–69); Boston, Massachusetts
- Education: University of Minnesota; University of Florida; National Technical University of Athens
- Known for: Catalysis, Nanoparticles, Single atom materials
- Awards: Fellow AAAS (2008), National Academy of Engineering (2014)
- Scientific career
- Fields: Chemical Engineer
- Workplaces: Tufts University, MIT, JPL
- Doctoral advisor: Lanny D. Schmidt

External videos
- "Inaugural Haber Professorship Lecture"
- "Maria Flytzani-Stephanopoulos: Decomposition of nitric oxide over Cu/ZSM-5"

Maria Flytzani-Stephanopoulos (1950 - October 28, 2019) was a Greek chemical engineer and, at the time of her death, had been the Robert and Marcy Haber Endowed Professor in Energy Sustainability and a distinguished professor at Tufts University. Flytzani-Stephanopoulos had also been the Raytheon Professor of Pollution Prevention at Tufts. She published more than 160 scientific articles with over 14,000 citations as of April 2018. She was a Fellow of the American Association for the Advancement of Science and American Institute of Chemical Engineers. She lived in the Greater Boston Area with her husband, Professor Gregory Stephanopoulos of MIT.

== Early life and education ==
Maria Flytzani was born and grew up in Greece. In 1973, she earned her diploma in chemical engineering from the National Technical University of Athens. She continued her studies at the University of Florida where she received a master's degree in chemical engineering in 1975. She completed her Ph.D. in chemical engineering at the University of Minnesota in 1975 with advisor Lanny D. Schmidt on the topic of oscillations in heterogeneous catalysis. Her thesis was published in 1978 with the title, "Surface Morphology of Platinum Catalysts and Oscillations in Ammonia Oxidation on Platinum". During her time in graduate school, Maria prepared 5 journal publications with her advisor:

- M. Flytzani-Stephanopoulos, L.D. Schmidt, R. Caretta "Steady State and Transient Oscillations in NH3 Oxidation on Pt", Journal of Catalysis 64, 346–355, (1980).
- S. Wong, M. F. Stephanopoulos, M. Chen, T. E. Hutchinson, and L. D. Schmidt "Morphologies of Pt Catalyst Surfaces", Journal of Vacuum Science and Technology 14, 452, (1977).
- M. F. Stephanopoulos, S. Wong, and L. D. Schmidt "Surface Morphology of Pt Catalysts", Journal of Catalysis 49, 51, (1977).
- M. F. Stephanopoulos, L. D. Schmidt "Evaporation Rates and Surface Profiles on Heterogeneous Surfaces with Mass Transfer", Chemical Engineering Science 34, 365, (1979).
- M. F. Stephanopoulos, L. D. Schmidt "Morphology and Etching Processes on Macroscopic Metal Catalysts", Progress in Surface Science 9, 83, (1979).

== Journal Publications ==
Maria Flytzani-Stephanopoulos authored more than 160 journal articles describing significant advances in catalysis, surface chemistry, and single-atom catalysts including:

- Yue Li, Qi Fu, Maria Flytzani-Stephanopoulos "Low-temperature water-gas shift reaction over Cu-and Ni-loaded cerium oxide catalysts", Applied Catalysis B: Environmental, 27(3), 179–191, (2000).
- Qi Fu, Howard Saltsburg, Maria Flytzani-Stephanopoulos "Active nonmetallic Au and Pt species on ceria-based water-gas shift catalysts", Science, 301(5635), 935–938, (2003).
- Rui Si, Maria Flytzani‐Stephanopoulos "Shape and Crystal‐Plane Effects of Nanoscale Ceria on the Activity of Au‐CeO2 Catalysts for the Water–Gas Shift Reaction", Angewandte Chemie, 120(15), 2926–2929, (2008).
- Yanping Zhai, Danny Pierre, Rui Si, Weiling Deng, Peter Ferrin, Anand U Nilekar, Guowen Peng, Jeffrey A Herron, David C Bell, Howard Saltsburg, Manos Mavrikakis, Maria Flytzani-Stephanopoulos "Alkali-stabilized Pt-OHx species catalyze low-temperature water-gas shift reactions", Science, 329(5999), 1633–1636, (2010).
- Ming Yang, Sha Li, Yuan Wang, Jeffrey A Herron, Ye Xu, Lawrence F Allard, Sungsik Lee, Jun Huang, Manos Mavrikakis, Maria Flytzani-Stephanopoulos "Catalytically active Au-O (OH) x-species stabilized by alkali ions on zeolites and mesoporous oxides", Science, 346(6216), 1498–1501, (2014).

== Awards and honors ==
Maria Flytzani-Stephanopoulos's contributions to research, education and service received numerous awards, many of which highlighted her passion for catalysis and the problems associated with nanoparticle design and catalytic function. In 2008, she was elected a fellow of the American Academy of Arts and Sciences (AAAS).

Maria Flytzani-Stephanopoulos of Tufts University's School of Engineering has been selected as an AAAS Fellow for distinguished contributions to the field of catalysis, particularly for new insights in oxidation reactions on nanoscale metal oxides in fuel conversion and pollutant processes.

— Election, AAAS, 2008

In 2014, she was elected a member of the American National Academy of Engineering (NAE). Her NAE election citation noted:

For contributions to atomically dispersed heterogeneous metal catalysts for efficient production of fuels and chemicals.

— Election Citation, National Academy of Engineering, 2014

Other awards and honors included:

- Tufts Distinguished Scholar Award
- Henry J. Albert Award of the International Precious Metals Institute
- Giuseppe Parravano Memorial Award of the Michigan Catalysis Society
- Carol Tyler Award of the IPMI
- Graduate Teaching and Mentoring Award of the Tufts School of Engineering
- Fellow, American Institute of Chemical Engineers
