= Raymond Gorte =

American chemical engineer (born 1954)

Russell Pearce and Elizabeth Crimian Heuer Professor Raymond J. Gorte
- Born: June 27, 1954 (age 72); Manitowoc, Wisconsin
- Education: University of Minnesota; University of Wisconsin
- Known for: Catalysis, Characterization, Fuel Cells
- Awards: Paul H. Emmett Award (1999), AIChE Wilhelm Award (2009), National Academy of Engineering (2018)
- Scientific career
- Fields: Chemical Engineer
- Workplaces: University of Pennsylvania
- Doctoral advisor: Lanny D. Schmidt

External videos
- "Ray Gorte: What do we know about solid acidity?" "LRSM Science Café: Raymond J. Gorte "Automotive Emissions-Control Systems: How Does It Work and What Did Volkswagen Do?"

Raymond John Gorte is an American chemical engineer, currently the Russel Pearce and Elizabeth Crimian Heuer Endowed Professor of Chemical and Biomolecular Engineering (CBE) and Materials Science & Engineering (MSE) at the University of Pennsylvania. Throughout his career at the University of Pennsylvania and the University of Minnesota, he has advanced the study of fuel cells and catalysts including heterogeneous metals and zeolite materials. He is a member of the U.S. National Academy of Engineering.

== Early life and education ==
Gorte was born in Wisconsin and grew up in Manitowoc, Wisconsin. In 1976, he earned a Bachelor of Science in chemical engineering from the University of Wisconsin-Madison. He completed his Ph.D. in chemical engineering at the University of Minnesota in 1981 with advisor Lanny D. Schmidt on the topic of platinum catalysis of nitric oxide decomposition. His thesis was published in 1981 with the title, "The Kinetic Interaction of Nitric-Oxide with Single Crystal Platinum".

== Professor of chemical engineering ==
Gorte joined the University of Pennsylvania's Department of Chemical and Biomolecular Engineering in Philadelphia in 1981. He was promoted to associate professor in 1987, and professor in 1993. He is a member of the Penn Center for Energy Innovation, the Laboratory for Research on the Structure of Matter (LRSM), and the Catalysis Center for Energy Innovation.

=== Fuel cells ===
Gorte's research in solid oxide fuel cells addresses the design of electrodes and applications in hydrocarbon oxidation. In 2000 he published an article in Nature with John Vohs describing the oxidation of methane and higher hydrocarbons with a composite anode of copper and ceria that achieves viable power densities while producing carbon dioxide and water.

=== Solid acids ===
The design, synthesis, and utilization of solid acids such as amorphous silica-alumina, ZSM-5, or synthetic faujasite relies on an understanding of the chemical site of acidity. Gorte has proposed a description of solid acidity based on a thermochemical cycle including the proton affinity, the interaction energy, and the enthalpy of adsorption. Gorte has also developed a method for quantifying acid site concentration based on alkylamine decomposition by the Hoffmann elimination reaction occurring by temperature programmed desorption (TPD). He has recently extended this to a highly precise method of "reactive gas chromatography".

=== Catalytic chemistry ===
Gorte's research in catalyst design has led to research projects on numerous applications and chemistries. He has published papers on the water-gas-shift reaction catalyzed by supported metals such as ceria-supported Pt, Pd and Rh. Other applications include:

- CO oxidation on supported metals
- Steam reforming of alkanes such as methane and butane.
- Dehydration of alcohols.

== Works ==
Gorte has authored more than 400 journal articles on catalysis, surface chemistry, and fuels cells which includes:

=== With his Advisor ===
- R. J. Gorte, L. D. Schmidt "Desorption Kinetics with Precursor Intermediates", Surface Science 76, 559, (1978).
- R. J. Gorte, L. D. Schmidt "Temperature Programmed Desorption with Reaction", Applications of Surface Science 3, 381, (1979).
- R. J. Gorte, L. D. Schmidt "Interactions between NO and CO on Pt(111)", Surface Science 111, 260, (1981).
- R. J. Gorte, L. D. Schmidt, J. L. Gland "Binding States and Decomposition of NO on Single Crystal Planes of Pt", Surface Science 109, 367, (1981).
- R. J. Gorte, B. A. Sexton, L. D. Schmidt "The Electron Energy Loss Spectrum of Isocyanic Acid on the Pt(111) Surface", Journal of Catalysis 67, 387, (1981).

=== At Univ. of Pennsylvania ===
- D. J. Parrillo, A. T. Adamo, G. T. Kokotailo, R. J. Gorte "Amine adsorption in H-ZSM-5", Applied Catalysis, 67(1), 107-118, (1990).
- G. S. Zafiris, R. J. Gorte "Evidence for low-temperature oxygen migration from ceria to Rh", Journal of Catalysis, 139(2), 561-567, (1993).
- D. J. Parrillo, C. Lee, R. J. Gorte "Heats of adsorption for ammonia and pyridine in H-ZSM-5: evidence for identical Brønsted-acid sites", Applied Catalysis A: General, 110(1), 67-74, (1994).
- W. E. Farneth, R. J. Gorte "Methods for Characterizing Zeolite Acidity", Chemical Reviews, 95, 615-635, (1995).
- T. Bunluesin, R. J. Gorte, G. W. Graham "Studies of the water-gas-shift reaction on ceria-supported Pt, Pd, and Rh: implications for oxygen-storage properties", Applied Catalysis B: Environmental, 15(1-2), 107-114, (1998).
- R. J. Gorte "What do we know about the acidity of solid acids?", Catalysis Letters, 62(1), 1-13, (1999).
- S. Park, J. M. Vohs, R. J. Gorte "Direct Oxidation of hydrocarbons in a solid oxide fuels cell", Nature, 404(6775), 265, (2000).
- Alan Atkinson, S. Barnett, Raymond J. Gorte, J. T. S. Irvine, Augustin J McEvoy, Mogens Mogensen, Subhash C Singhal, J. Vohs "Advanced anodes for high-temperature fuel cells", Nature Materials, 3(1), 17, (2004).

== Honors ==
Gorte has received awards for his contributions to research, education and service, many of which highlight his interest in fuel cells and catalysis and the problems associated with characterization and fundamental mechanisms and kinetics. In 2018, Gorte was elected a member of the National Academy of Engineering. His election citation stated:

For fundamental contributions and their applications to heterogeneous catalysts and solid state electrochemical devices..

— Election Citation, National Academy of Engineering, 2018

Other awards and honors include:

- (1997) Giuseppe Parravano Memorial Award of the Michigan Catalysis Society
- (1998) Philadelphia Catalysis Club Award
- (1999) Paul H. Emmett Award in Fundamental Catalysis
- (2001) Penn Engineering Distinguished Research Award
- (2002) Heilmeier Award for Excellence in Faculty Research
- (2009) R.H. Wilhelm Award in Chemical Reaction Engineering
