= Dionisios Vlachos =

Greek-American chemical engineer

Allan & Myra Ferguson Chair Dionisios G. Vlachos
- Born: 1964 (age 61–62); Greece
- Education: University of Minnesota; National Technical University of Athens
- Known for: Catalysis, Reaction Engineering, Microreactors, Biomass
- Awards: AIChE Wilhelm Award (2011), AAAS Fellow (2009)
- Scientific career
- Fields: Chemical Engineer
- Workplaces: University of Delaware
- Doctoral advisor: Lanny D. Schmidt; Rutherford Aris

External videos
- “Dion Vlachos as The Allan & Myra Ferguson Professor of Chemical and Biomolecular Engineering” “Catalysis Center for Energy Innovation”

Dionisios G. Vlachos is an American chemical engineer, the Allan & Myra Ferguson Endowed Chair Professor of Chemical Engineering at the University of Delaware and director of the Catalysis Center for Energy Innovation, a U.S. Department of Energy - Energy Frontiers Research Center. Throughout his career at University of Delaware and the University of Minnesota, he has advanced the study of catalysts and reaction engineering including catalytic applications in biomass utilization, alkane conversion and zeolites. He is a fellow of the American Association for the Advancement of Science (AAAS, 2009) and recipient of the Wilhelm Award of the American Institute of Chemical Engineers (2011).

== Early life and education ==
Dionisios was born in Greece and grew up on the island of Cephalonia, Greece in the Ionian Sea. In 1987, he earned a diploma in chemical engineering from the National Technical University of Athens. He completed a master's degree in 1990 with thesis, "Step Dynamics for Modeling of Crystal Surfaces". He completed his Ph.D. in chemical engineering at the University of Minnesota in 1992 with advisors Lanny D. Schmidt and Rutherford Aris on the topic of dynamic crystal surfaces as it pertains to catalysis. His thesis was published in 1992 with the title, "Structure and Dynamics of Adsorbed Phases and Crystal Surfaces". During his time in graduate school, Dionisios prepared thirteen journal publications with his advisor including:

- D. G. Vlachos, L. D. Schmidt, and R. Aris, The Effect of Phase Transitions, Surface Diffusion, and Defects on Surface Reactions: Fluctuations and Oscillations, J. Chem. Phys. 93, 8306-8313 (1990).
- D.G. Vlachos, L.D. Schmidt, R. Aris Structures of Small Metal Clusters: Isomerization and Phase Transitions, Journal of Chemical Physics 96, 6891 (1992).
- D.G. Vlachos, F. Schuth, R. Aris, L.D. Schmidt "Spatial and Temporal Patterns in Catalytic Oscillations", Physics A: Statistical Mechanics and its Applications 188(1-3), 302-321 (1992).

== Professor of chemical engineering ==
Dr. Vlachos joined the University of Massachusetts Amherst Department of Chemical Engineering in Amherst, MA in 1993 as an assistant professor. He was promoted to associate professor in 1998, after which he took a position as associate professor of chemical engineering at the University of Delaware in 2000. In 2003, he was promoted to the rank of professor of chemical engineering. In 2009, he became the Elizabeth Inez Kelley Professor of Chemical Engineering, a position which he held until 2016. In 2015, he became a professor (joint) of physics and astronomy at the University of Delaware.

=== Leadership roles ===
Vlachos has served in leadership roles with national and international oversight of chemical engineering research. In 2008, he became the director of the University of Delaware Center for Catalytic Science and Technology (CCST), which he held until 2011. In 2009, he led the formation of the Catalysis Center for Energy Innovation (CCEI), a national Department of Energy research center with over 70 people from around the United States. In 2016, he was appointed the director of the Delaware Energy Institute (UDEI). He is also the fundamentals division leader within the Dept. of Energy RAPID Manufacturing Institute starting in 2017.

=== Research ===
Vlachos' research has focused on four areas of chemical engineering and materials science:

==== Surface chemistry and catalysis ====
His contributions to catalysis and surface chemistry have addressed the challenges associated with combining experiment, calculation and modeling for complex catalysis. For example, he has published numerous papers on the reforming of hydrocarbons, including microkinetic descriptions of hundreds of reactions on supported metals. Other research has addressed liquid phase dehydration and/or hydrodeoxygenation of biomass-derived molecules such as furfural, dimethylfuran, or benzoic acid. He has expanded on general approaches to catalytic design by using descriptors in parallel with efforts to develop reaction models with the accuracy of first principles approaches.

==== Nanoparticles and synthesis ====
His interest in nanoparticles includes his master's thesis entitled, "Step Dynamics for Modeling of Crystal Surfaces." A focus on crystal structures and growth behavior continued with a focus on the nucleation, growth and design of nanoporous materials including zeolites and MOFs. His research on nanoparticle synthesis was frequently combined in the impact on applications including catalysis, adsorption, and separation via membranes.

==== Modeling and simulation ====
Vlachos' approach to modeling is identified by its breadth of scale from molecular, to particle, and macroscale for applications across reaction chemistry, separations, and biology. His interests also include advanced approaches to couple molecular dynamics with quantum mechanical simulations as well as accelerate stochastic simulations.

==== Energy, fuels and reactors ====
Vlachos' research in engineering and science applications in to fuel and energy address broad areas including microreactor design, catalyst design, chemical reaction network development for fuel chemistry, and optimization of energy systems. For example, his research on hydrocarbon microflame stability provides insight into the design principles of microburners. He has also developed molecular-level descriptions of the pyrolysis of cellulose and biomass with applications in renewable biofuels.

=== Broader impact ===
His research has had broader impact on the educational and industrial sectors by translation of his interests beyond the university.

His research in collaboration with his colleagues has directly led to the following technologies:

- Advanced electrodes for fuel cells: As a replacement for platinum, Vlachos and co-workers have developed a tungsten carbide material composed of nanoparticles with improved performance.
- Renewable rubber for automobile tires: Chemical conversion of sugar to isoprene provides a renewable pathway to manufacture poly-(cis)-isoprene, the key rubber material in automobile tires. Vlachos and co-workers have developed a catalyst and process to synthesize isoprene at high yield.
- Advanced soap and surfactants: The preparation of advanced soaps/detergents (i.e., surfactants), includes unique chemical properties and a chemical process for manufacture. As part of the Catalysis Center for Energy Innovation, Vlachos and co-workers have developed a class of "oleo-furan sulfonate" (OFS) surfactants with unique properties beyond conventional molecules.
- Renewable PET polyester: Vlachos and co-workers have developed a catalyst and process to make para-xylene, the key monomer in the plastic PET (poly-ethylene-terephthalate).

=== Teaching and advising ===
Vlachos has supervised and mentored over 50 graduate Ph.D. students and 40 post-doctoral scholars. His advising has produced numerous industrial leaders and faculty in the academia, with several former students at leading institutions of research and education including Jeff Rimer (Univ. of Houston), Mark Snyder (Lehigh University), Ayman Karim (Virginia Tech), George Tsilomelekis (Rutgers University), and Giannis Mpourmpakis (Univ. of Pittsburgh).

== Journal publications ==
Dionisios Vlachos has authored more than 350 journal articles describing significant advances in catalysis, microreactors, and energy applications which include:

- V. Nikolakis, E. Kokkoli, M. Tirrell, M. Tsapatsis, D.G. Vlachos "Zeolite growth by addition of subcolloidal particles: Modeling and experimental validation", Chemistry of Materials, 12(3), 845-853 (2000).
- Z. Lai, Griselda Bonilla, I. Diaz, J.G. Nery, K. Sujaoti, M.A. Amat, E. Kokkoli, O. Terasaki, R.W. Thompson, M. Tsapatsis, D.G. Vlachos "Microstructural optimization of a zeolite membrane for organic vapor separation", Science, 300(5618), 456-460 (2003).
- Y. Chen, D.G. Vlachos "Hydrogenation of ethylene and dehydrogenation and hydrogenolysis of ethane on Pt (111) and Pt (211): a density functional theory study", Journal of Physical Chemistry C, 114(11), 4973-4982 (2010).
- Vassili Vorotnikov, Giannis Mpourmpakis, Dionisios G Vlachos "DFT study of furfural conversion to furan, furfuryl alcohol, and 2-methylfuran on Pd (111)", ACS Catalysis, 2(12), 2496-2504 (2012).
- V. Choudhary, S.H. Mushrif, C. Ho, A. Anderko, V. Nikolakis, N.S. Marinkovic, A.I. Frenkel, S.I. Sandler, D.G. Vlachos"Insights into the interplay of Lewis and Brønsted acid catalysts in glucose and fructose conversion to 5-(hydroxymethyl) furfural and levulinic acid in aqueous media", Journal of the American Chemical Society, 135(10), 3997-4006 (2013).

== Awards and honors ==
Vlachos' contributions to research, education and service have received numerous awards, many of which demonstrate his interests in catalysis, mathematics and the problems associated with energy and sustainability. In 2016, he was appointed director of the University of Delaware Energy Institute. His appointment was highlighted as:

"Dion Vlachos has an international reputation as a leader in renewable energy research and catalysis,"

— Provost Domenico Grasso, Univ. of Delaware 2016

Other awards and honors include:

- (2016) Philadelphia Catalysis Club Award
- (2015) ICI Distinguished Lecture, University of Alberta
- (2014) J.D. Lindsay Lecture Series, Texas A&M University
- (2011) R.H. Wilhelm Award in Chemical Reaction Engineering
- (2009) AAAS Fellow
- (2007) George Piercy Distinguished Visiting Professorship - Univ. of Minnesota
- (2003) Provost's Merit Award - Univ. of Delaware
- (1997) NSF Career Award
