= Reactive flash volatilization =

Chemical process

Reactive flash volatilization (RFV) is a chemical process that rapidly converts nonvolatile solids and liquids to volatile compounds by thermal decomposition for integration with catalytic chemistries.

== Chemistry ==
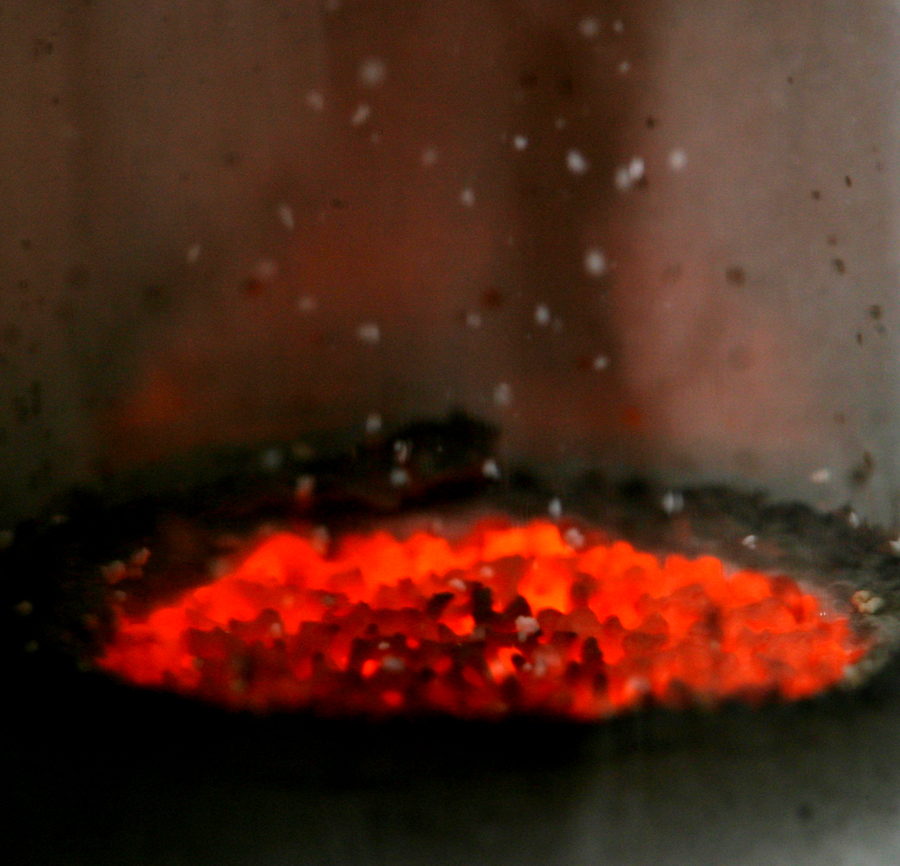

The utilization of heavy fossil fuels or biomass rich in carbohydrates, (C_{6}H_{10}O_{5})_{n}, for fuels or chemicals requires an initial thermochemical process called pyrolysis which fractures large polymers to mixtures of small volatile organic compounds (VOCs). A specific method of pyrolysis of biomass, termed "fast pyrolysis," converts particles of biomass to about 10% carbon-rich solid called char, about 15% gases such as carbon dioxide, and about 70% a mixture of organic compounds commonly referred to as "bio-oil" at 500 °C in 1–2 seconds.

Pyrolysis: Biomass + Heat → 0.70VOCs + 0.10Char + 0.15Gases

The volatile organics can be collected as a brown, highly acidic liquid for further thermochemical conversion by traditional processes such as steam reforming, gasification, catalytic partial oxidation, catalytic cracking, combustion, or hydrotreating.

Catalytic steam reforming: VOCs + H_{2}O + Heat + Catalyst → H_{2} + CO + Catalyst
Catalytic partial oxidation: VOCs + O_{2} + Catalyst → H_{2} + CO + Heat + Catalyst
Catalytic combustion: VOCs + O_{2} + Catalyst → CO_{2} + H_{2}O + Heat + Catalyst

These two sets of chemistries, pyrolysis and catalytic processing, are combined to form the reactive flash volatilization process. Solid hydrocarbons or biomass are contacted with high temperature (500–900 °C) catalysts to generate gases and volatile organic compounds. The volatile species flow into the catalyst with a reactant (H_{2}, O_{2}, or H_{2}O) to convert to desirable products (H_{2}, CO, H_{2}O, CO_{2}, or VOCs).

RFV: Biomass + heat + Reactant + Catalyst → Gases + VOCs + Reactant + Catalyst → Products + Catalyst

== Discovery ==
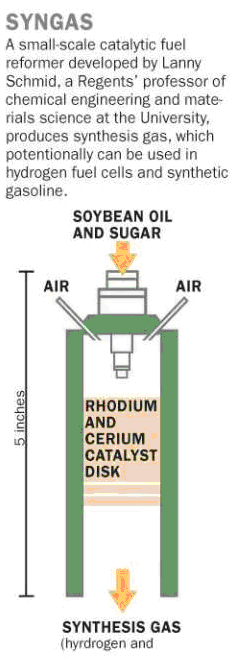

Reactive flash volatilization was demonstrated in 2006 in the journal Science by the high temperature (700–800 °C) conversion of soybean oil (triglycerides) and sugar (D-(+)-glucose) to synthesis gas (H_{2} + CO) and olefins (ethylene and propylene). Complete, continuous catalytic conversion of heavy fuels was surprising, because the initial pyrolytic chemistry has been shown to generate significant amounts of solid residue called "char" which was expected to block the necessary interaction between the reactant compounds and the solid metal catalyst.

The process has been described, "The low volatility of these biofuel feedstocks not only leads to soot production when they are used directly in internal combustion engines but also causes them to coat industrial catalysts with a deactivating layer of carbon, thus hindering their conversion to lighter products. James Richard Salge and colleagues show that if heavy fuels such as soybean oil or biodiesel are sprayed onto hot rhodium-cerium catalysts as fine droplets in the presence of oxygen, the fuels can self-heat and fully react to form hydrogen without carbon formation and catalyst deactivation." RFV: Triglyceride + O_{2} + Catalyst → Ethylene + Propylene + CO_{2} + H_{2}O + Catalyst

The process converted 70% of the atomic hydrogen in soy-oil triglycerides to molecular H_{2}, and 60% of atomic carbon to carbon monoxide on a Rh-based catalyst with Cerium supported on alpha-alumina. Under different operating conditions, the process can produce a significant amount of ethylene and propylene.

The first demonstration of reactive flash volatilization occurred by a series of experimental steps:

1. The researchers start with either pure soybean oil or a thick sugar syrup.
2. The reactor consists of an automotive fuel injector, used to spray the oil or syrup as fine droplets through a tube. Sitting like a plug in the tube is a porous ceramic disk made of a rhodium-cerium catalyst material.
3. As the droplets hit the disk-whose surface temperature is 1,000 °C-the heat and oxygen break apart the molecules of oil or sugar.
4. The catalyst guides the breakdown toward the production of syngas rather than toward water vapor and carbon.
5. The syngas passes through the porous disk and is collected downstream in the tube.
6. No external heating is needed because the chemical reactions release enough heat to break up molecules of oil or sugar following in their wake.

An initial supply of heat is necessary to achieve temperatures of 300 °C, after which the reaction initiates, or "lights off," and quickly rises to temperatures of 700–800 °C. Under steady conditions, the reaction generates sufficient heat to maintain the high temperature, extremely fast chemistry. The total time for conversion of heavy, nonvolatile compounds to volatile or gaseous species occurs in milliseconds (or thousandths of a second).

== Application to Solid Biomass ==
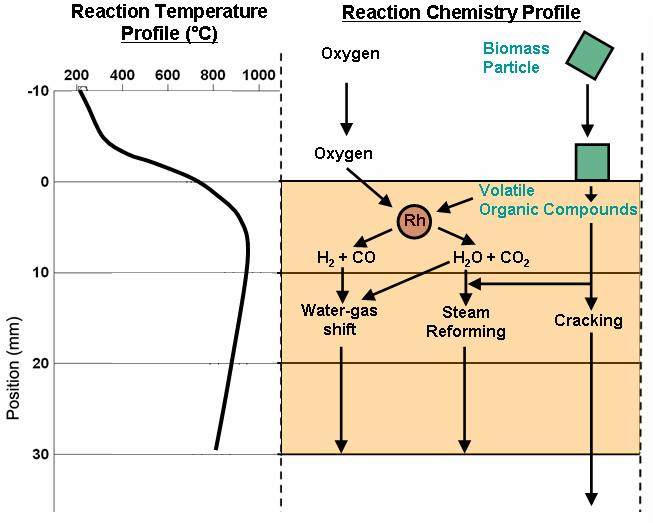

Reactive flash volatilization of solid particles composed of cellulose, starch, lignin, Quaking Aspen (Populus tremuloides) wood chips, and polyethylene was demonstrated in 2007 in the scientific journal Angewandte Chemie. Particles of cellulose were completely converted to syngas (H_{2} and CO) and combustion products (H_{2}O and CO_{2}) in as little as 30 milliseconds. Catalytic reforming of all materials occurred without the requirement of an external heat source while operating at 500–900 °C. Under optimal conditions, 50% of all atomic hydrogen and 50% of all atomic carbon can be converted to molecular H_{2} and carbon monoxide in as little time as 30 milliseconds. Reaction chemistry was demonstrated on both a Rh-Ce/alumina catalyst and a Ni-Ce/alumina catalyst.

A publication in the scientific journal Green Chemistry demonstrated that the process of reactive flash volatilization can be considered a combination of several other global chemistries occurring through thermal and chemical integration. As shown in the diagram at the right, the initial pyrolysis chemistry occurs when the biomass particle (green) physically contacts the hot catalyst (orange). Volatile organic compounds (VOCs) flow into the catalyst with oxygen, adsorb on Rh atoms, and react to form combustion products (H_{2}O and CO_{2}) and syngas (H_{2} and CO). After this initial chemistry, three main global reactions occur. Combustion products react catalytically with syngas by the water-gas shift reaction. Also, volatile organics react catalytically with steam (H_{2}O) to form new combustion products and syngas. Finally, the volatile organics can crack homogeneously in the gas phase to form smaller volatile organics.

The operating temperature has been shown to vary within the catalyst length while also being a strong function of the biomass-to-oxygen ratio. An experimental examination has shown that the heat required to thermally fracture biomass was generated within the catalyst bed by surface oxidation reactions. The temperature profile (and reaction temperature) was shown to be extremely important to prevent the formation of carbon at equilibrium. Very fast conversion has been attributed to high operating temperatures, but the maximum cellulose processing rate has not been determined. However, catalytic partial oxidation of volatile organic compounds has shown that complete conversion can occur in less than 10 milliseconds.
