= Sabatier principle =

Chemistry rule regarding heterogenous catalysis

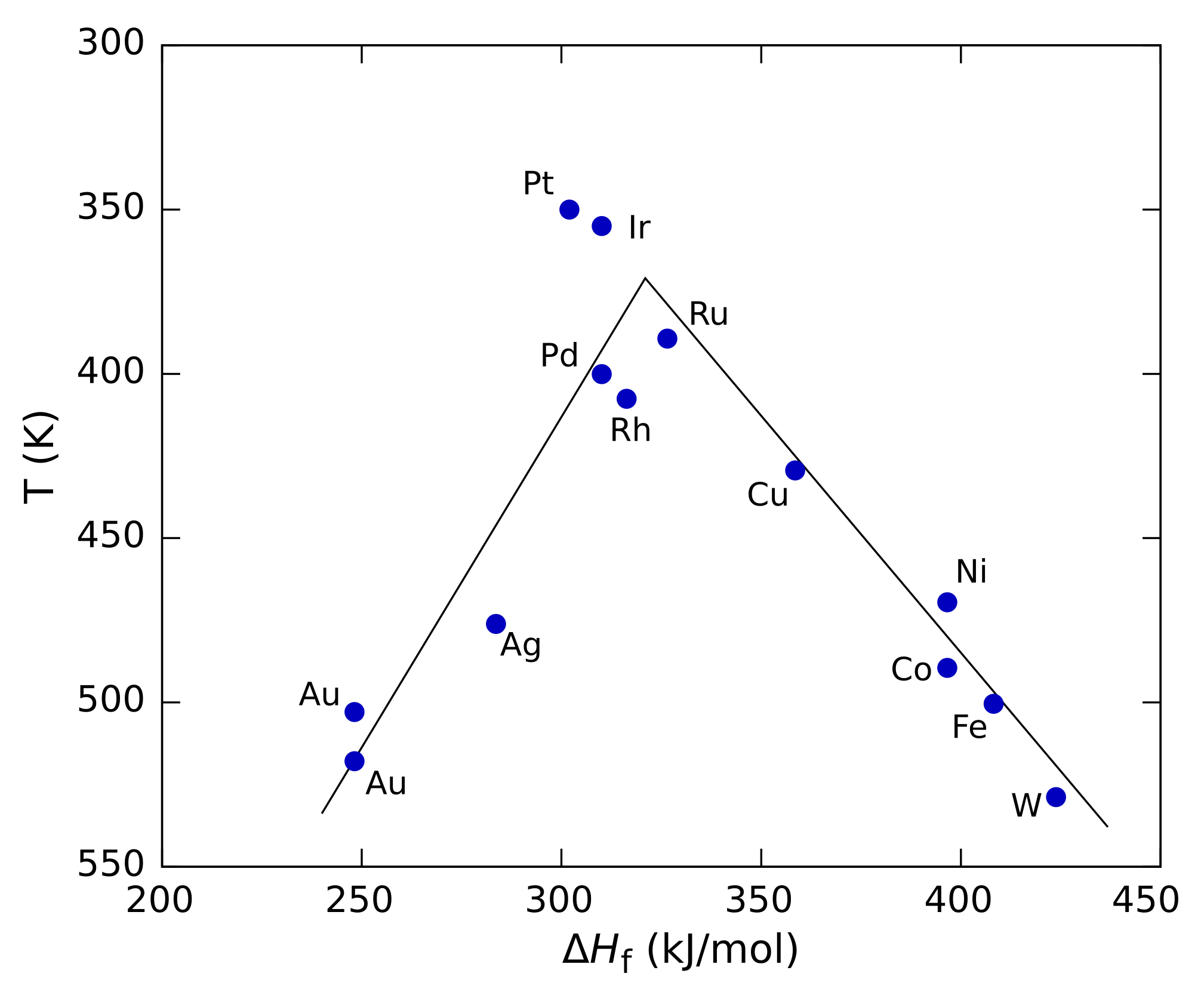
Volcano plot for the decomposition of formic acid on transition metals

In chemistry, the Sabatier principle is a qualitative concept in heterogeneous catalysis named after the French chemist Paul Sabatier. It states that the interactions between the catalyst and the reactants should be "just right"; that is, neither too strong nor too weak. If the interaction is too weak, the molecule will fail to bind to the catalyst and no reaction will take place. On the other hand, if the interaction is too strong, the product fails to dissociate.

The principle can be shown graphically by plotting the reaction rate against a property such as the heat of adsorption of the reactant by the catalyst. Such plots pass through a maximum, looking roughly like a triangle or an inverted parabola, and are called volcano plots because of their shape. Analogous three-dimensional plots can also be built against two different properties, such as the heats of adsorption of the two reactants for a two-component reaction. In that case the plot is generally shown as a contour plot and is called a volcano surface. Volcano plots were introduced by Balandin.

The figure on the right shows a volcano plot for the decomposition of formic acid using different transition metals as catalysts. In this case, the heat of formation (Δ_{f}H) of the metal formate salt was used for the x axis because studies showed that the reaction intermediate was a surface formate. For the y axis, the temperature at which the reaction reaches a specific rate was used (the y axis is plotted in reverse to preserve the conventional "volcano" shape). At low values of Δ_{f}H, the reaction is slow (in other words, requires higher temperatures) because the rate of adsorption is slow and rate-limiting. At high values of Δ_{f}H, desorption becomes the rate-limiting step. The maximum rate, which is observed for the platinum group metals in this case, requires intermediate values of Δ_{f}H, with the rate being a combination of the rate of adsorption and the rate of desorption. Catalysts can exceed the Sabatier limit via catalytic resonance.
