= Catalytic combustion =

Catalytic combustion process using a catalyst to reduce pollutants

Catalytic combustion is a chemical process which uses a catalyst to speed desired oxidation reactions of fuel and so reduce the formation of undesired products, especially pollutant nitrogen oxide gases (NO_{x}) far below what can be achieved without catalysts. The process was discovered in the 1950s by Catalytic Combustion LLC.

== Chemical process ==
Catalysts may be used to control combustion reactions in the following ways:

1. fuel preparation, such as splitting long molecules into shorter ones;
2. fuel oxidation to release heat energy;
3. the destruction of pollutant gases in the exhaust.

== Technology ==
Catalytic combustion was developed by Norb Ruff in the 1950s. He founded Catalytic Combustion LLC in the 1950s where he created and patented the first metal catalyst. Other early work was carried out by researchers at Acurex, Westinghouse, NASA and the United States Air Force. The technique was revisited in the 1990s, leading to two types of catalytic system: Catalytica's fuel-lean approach, and Precision Combustion's fuel-rich approach.

== See also ==
- Gas chromatography: Detectors
- Lanny D. Schmidt
