= List of fuel cell manufacturers =

A fuel cell is an electrochemical energy conversion device. Fuel cells differ from batteries in that they are designed for continuous replenishment of the reactants consumed.

This is a partial list of companies currently producing commercially available fuel cell systems for use in residential, commercial, or industrial settings. Fuel cell systems from these manufacturers are currently being used to generate AC or DC electricity, heat, water, or any combination of the three.

Company	Products
AFC Energy	Hydrogen fuel cells Alpha System and Betha System
Air Liquide	Hydrogen fuel cells and hydrogen filling centers
Apollo Energy Systems	Alkaline fuel cells
Ballard	Proton-exchange membrane (PEM) fuel cells
Bloom Energy	Bloom Energy Server "Bloom Box"
Ceres Power	Solid-oxide fuel cells (SOFCs) and reversible solid oxide cells (rSOCs)
Cummins	Hydrogen fuel cells, vehicles
Doosan Fuel Cell America	PureCell Model 400 and SOFC
FuelCell Energy	Molten carbonate fuel cells
GenCell	Alkaline fuel cells GenCell REX
Horizon	ECOBOC-MR, Aerostack, Hydromax
Hydrogenics	Hydrogen fuel cells and electrolysers
Hyundai Motor	Hydrogen fuel cell electric vehicles (FCEVs)
Intelligent Energy	PEM fuel cells, FCM-800 and IE-SOAR series
Kyocera	SOFCs and systems
Mitsubishi Heavy Industries	SOFCs and hybrid SOFC and micro gas turbine Megamie
Panasonic	Integration of hydrogen fuel cells and photovoltaic (PV) systems - Panasonic HX
Plug Power Inc.	GenDrive, GenSure, ProGen
Robert Bosch GmbH	PEMFC and SOFC
SFC Energy	Direct methanol fuel cells and hydrogen fuel cells
Toshiba	Ene-Farm, H2Rex
