= Fuel Cell Energy =

Fuel Cell Energy may be:

- the electrochemical device, Fuel Cell
- the energy company, FuelCell Energy
