= AEMFC =

AEMFC could refer to:

- African Exploration Mining and Finance Corporation
- Anion Exchange Membrane Fuel Cells
