= Viessmann =

German company

Viessmann Generations Group

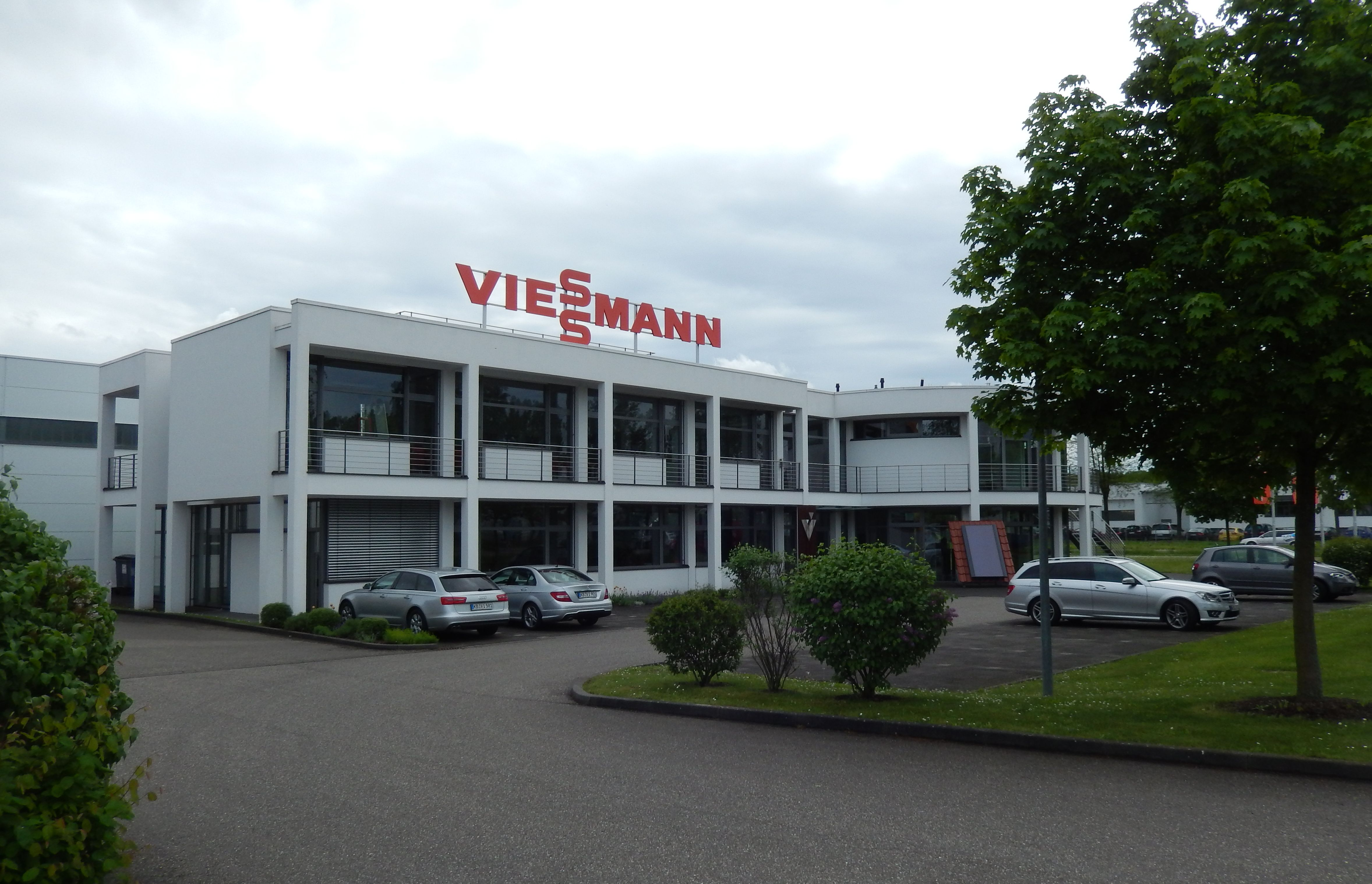
- Viessmann buildings in Freiburg im Breisgau
- Company type: GmbH & Co KG
- Industry: Heating and Refrigeration Systems
- Founded: 1917
- Founder: Johann Viessmann
- Headquarters: Battenberg (Eder), Germany
- Revenue: 4 billion € (2022)
- Number of employees: 14,500 (2022)
- Website: www.viessmann.group

The Viessmann Generations Group (formerly Viessmann Group) is a holding company of the Viessmann family. The company’s core business until 2023 consisted of heating technology products. In April 2023, the U.S. corporation Carrier Global acquired this division of Viessmann for 12 billion € and continues it as Viessmann Climate Solutions SE.

The Viessmann Generations Group invests in existing as well as emerging companies, in areas such as environmental and climate protection, the promotion of better health, education, and science. This includes companies in the fields of network infrastructure, local and district heating infrastructure, or cooling and cleanroom technology.

As of 2023, Viessmann was represented with 22 production companies in 12 countries, 68 sales companies in 31 countries, and 120 sales offices.

The company was founded in Hof an der Saale in 1917 by Johann Viessmann and has been family-owned for four generations. As of 2022, the company employed 14,500 people and reported annual sales of € 4 billion.

== Profile ==
With 22 production companies in 12 countries and worldwide with sales companies, agencies and trade partners in 74 countries, Viessmann is internationally oriented. More than 54 percent of turnover is generated abroad.

For the company's 100th anniversary in 2017, a new research and development center was inaugurated at the headquarters in Allendorf in the presence of German Chancellor Angela Merkel. With a volume of 50 million euros, the "Technikum" represents the largest single investment in the history of the company.

Viessmann is also active in the fields of investment, real estate and VC/O. Viessmann Investment develops growth potential and new markets through targeted acquisitions in medium-sized companies. Viessmann Real Estate deals with real estate, hotels and catering. VC/O is Viessmann's digital unit, which observes and shapes developments with regard to digitalisation and new business models. The VC/O includes, among others, the Maschinenraum in Berlin.

The Viessmann Group includes Viessmann Kraft-Wärme-Kopplung GmbH (formerly ESS Energie Systeme & Service GmbH) as a producer of combined heat and power units, and Schmack Biogas Service GmbH as a market leader in the biogas sector. The group also includes the French medium boiler manufacturers Stein Energie and Sodiet (Viessmann Industrie France), as well as Viessmann Eis-Energiespeicher GmbH.

In 2012, the Viessmann Group acquired 100 percent of shares in Viessmann Kältetechnik AG in Hof. The company is one of the most important manufacturers of temperature-controlled rooms for trade and industry. In addition, the Finnish Norpe Group, the leading Scandinavian manufacturer of commercial refrigeration units, finned products and cooling units for the food retail trade, was acquired in 2013.

In September 2016, Viessmann launched heizung.de, an information and advice portal aimed specifically at end users such as new builders and refurbishment companies. Viessmann has also been operating the start-up company Builder Wattx in Berlin since 2016.

Viessmann Investment also has holdings in the Polish manufacturer Kospel, which produces instantaneous water heaters, electric boilers and hot water storage tanks, Pewo (a specialist in heat transfer stations for local and district heating based in Dresden) and the installation and service provider for complex central heating systems Thermowise in South Africa. The portfolio of Viessmann Investment also includes LämpöYkkönen (full-range supplier for heat pumps in Finland), the electrical and infrared heating manufacturer Etherma in Austria and the British online retailer for Viessmann products and spare parts, Viessmann Direct in England.

Also in 2018, the company built a solar park next to its headquarters in Allendorf to cover up to 7 percent of the company's own electricity requirements. The plant has an output of 2 MW and was built without state subsidies. Instead, the project is financed by the company's own consumption of electrical energy.

The company also operates the Allendorf airfield.

== Products ==
On the purely technical side, Viessmann provides a range of HVAC products as well as services, industrial and refrigeration products.

- Condensing technology oil and gas systems
- Solar thermal systems
- Photovoltaic systems
- Heat pumps
- Biomass heating systems (wood)
- Combined heat and power generation (CHP)
- Biogas systems
- Fuel cell systems including home fuel cells
- Ventilation and air-conditioning equipment
- Digital services for seamless connectivity with products and systems

for commercial, industrial, and residential purposes ranging from 1.5 to 120,000 kW.

== History ==
The Viessmann Group originated in Hof on the banks of the Saale, where Johann Viessmann set up a small workshop in 1917 specialising in the construction of steel boilers. In 1937 he moved operations to Allendorf (Eder) in northern Hesse. After World War II, Hans Vießmann took over his father's company and modernized it by introducing series production and industrial processes. In the 1950s and 1960s, oil replaced the previously used solid fuels, whilst steel boilers became increasingly important. Viessmann seized these growth opportunities and developed into a medium-sized industrial enterprise with 1,400 employees.

The 1970s were a time of expansion. In 1972, Viessmann opened its first foreign factory in Faulquemont (France), followed by Waterloo, Ontario (Canada), the first site outside Europe, in 1978. With the development of new technologies, the company responded to the challenges of the energy crisis: In 1976, the first solar collectors were produced, followed by the first heat pumps in 1978.

The fall of the Berlin Wall in 1989 opened up new markets – initially in the former East Germany and later in Eastern Europe. At the end of 1991/start of 1992, Dr. Hans Vießmann handed the company over to his son Dr. Martin Viessmann.

In the 1990s, major structural changes were taking place: from floorstanding boilers to wall mounted boilers, from oil to gas, from gas-fired boilers to condensing technology. Viessmann set up a new production facility for wall mounted gas boilers in Allendorf, whilst developing an international sales office and branch network. As of 2005, the company launched the "Efficiency Plus" campaign focusing on demonstrating energy saving and sustainable processes and reducing the company's environmental footprint, whilst also expanding the product range with the acquisition of other technologies. Viessmann first acquired wood combustion specialists Mawera and Köb, followed by KWT, a manufacturer of large heat pumps and ESS for combined heating and power systems. BIOFerm, Schmack and Carbotech acquisitions covered the area of biogas technology, and with an evacuated tube solar collectors plant in Dachang (China), the company has expanded its market presence into solar thermal systems.

Following the introduction of the company's "Efficiency Plus" campaign, Viessmann received both in 2009 and 2011 the German Sustainability Award for most sustainable production and most sustainable brand in Germany, respectively. In 2010 the company also received the Energy Efficiency Award for optimising energy production and use in its manufacturing facilities. In 2013, the company received the German Sustainability Award for the third time.

Since January 2022, Martin Viessmann leads the Group as chairman of the executive board. The business is headed by Max Viessmann as CEO and Ulrich Hüllmann as CFO.

In December 2025, Viessmann announced that through their Foundation they will give 500,000 euros to eight local initiatives that support democracy and strengthen civil society in Germany.

== Sports ==
Viessmann is sponsor of various winter sports. In addition, various German athletes from winter sports are sponsored. In biathlon, the team includes Sven Fischer, Denise Herrmann, Benedikt Doll, and Uschi Disl. The Nordic combined athletes Julian Schmid and Johannes Rydzek are in the Viessmann team, as well as ski jumpers Katharina Schmid, Karl Geiger, and Constantin Schmid. Since 2018, the company has also been the regional partner of FC Bayern Munich in South East Asia.

== See also ==
- Allendorf Airport
