= Fuel Cell Development Information Center =

Japanese research center

- 一般社団法人燃料電池開発情報センター
- Abbreviation: FCDIC
- Formation: July 1986
- Type: Non-profit organisation
- Headquarters: Tokyo, Japan
- Website: www.fcdic.jp/fcdic-en/

The Fuel Cell Development Information Center (FCDIC; 一般社団法人燃料電池開発情報センター) is a Japanese non-profit organisation established in July 1986 to facilitate the exchange of information on fuel cell research, development, and deployment among its members. It is headquartered in Tokyo, Japan.

== History ==
FCDIC was founded in July 1986 with the support of Japanese electric power companies, the New Energy and Industrial Technology Development Organization (NEDO, then known as the New Energy Development Organization), and electronics manufacturers. At its founding, the organisation had 78 member organisations, and its secretariat was provisionally housed within the Agency of Industrial Science and Technology. The first annual report, Fuel Cell RD&D in Japan, was published in June 1987.

The organisation has been cited in academic literature as a source of annual reporting on Japanese fuel cell research and development activity.

The first annual Fuel Cell Symposium was held in June 1994, chaired by Kenichiro Ota. In 1996, FCDIC served as the secretariat for the 2nd International Fuel Cell Conference (IFCC), co-organised by NEDO and sponsored by the Ministry of International Trade and Industry.

In August 2014, FCDIC was re-registered as a general incorporated association (ippan shadan hōjin) under Japanese law. In 2016, marking its 30th anniversary, the organisation established the FCDIC Honoring System to recognise contributions to fuel cell development and related industries.

== Membership and activities ==
As of 2024, FCDIC consists of more than 110 member organisations, including major Japanese private companies and national organisations working on fuel cell development, 74 academic members, and 17 foreign members. The organisation holds workshops, lecture courses, and an annual symposium, which attracts approximately 1,000 participants including international delegates.

FCDIC co-sponsors the International Hydrogen and Fuel Cell Expo held in Japan, alongside the Hydrogen Energy Systems Society of Japan.

== Publications ==
FCDIC publishes the following:

- The Journal of Fuel Cell Technology – a quarterly journal published in January, April, July, and October. Articles are written in Japanese, with titles, table captions, and figure captions also given in English, and English-language abstracts included.
- Fuel Cell RD&D in Japan – an annual report surveying the current state of fuel cell research, development, and deployment in Japan, written in both Japanese and English.
- FCDIC Report – a bimonthly newsletter reporting on fuel cell news, published in English and available on the FCDIC website.

== See also ==
- Fuel cell
- National Institute of Advanced Industrial Science and Technology
- New Energy and Industrial Technology Development Organization
