= Home fuel cell =

Cell used for power generation

A home fuel cell or a residential fuel cell is an electrochemical cell used for primary or backup power generation. They are similar to the larger industrial stationary fuel cells, but built on a smaller scale for residential use. These fuel cells are usually based on combined heat and power (CHP) or micro combined heat and power (m-CHP) technology, generating both power and heated water or air.

== Uses ==
Home fuel cells are installed alongside grid-provided mains power to consistently produce the exact amount of electricity and heat needed. Additionally, a home fuel cell may be combined with a traditional furnace that produces only heat. For example, the German company Viessmann produces a home fuel cell with an electric power of 0 kW and a thermal power of 1 kW, integrated with a traditional 19 kW heat-producing furnace, using the grid for electricity needs below and above the fuel cell production.

PEMFC fuel cell m-CHP operates at low temperature (50 to 100 °C) and requires high-purity hydrogen. It is prone to contamination, and changes can be made to operate at higher temperatures and improve the fuel reformer. The SOFC fuel cell m-CHP operates at a high temperature (500 to 1,000 °CP) and can handle different energy sources, but the high temperature requires expensive materials to handle the temperature. Changes can be made to operate at a lower temperature. Because of the higher temperature, SOFCs in general have a longer start-up time.

== Environmental impact ==
Because the home fuel cell generates electricity and heat that are both used on site, theoretical efficiency approaches 100%. This is in contrast to traditional or fuel cell non-domestic electricity production, which has both a transmission loss and useless heat, requiring extra energy consumption for domestic heating. The home fuel cell cannot generate exactly the needed amount of both heat and electricity at all times. Therefore, they are typically not a standalone installation, but are rather combined with a traditional furnace and connected to the grid for electricity needs above or below that produced by the fuel cell. As such, the overall efficiency is below 100%.

The high efficiency of home fuel cells has caused some countries, such as Germany, to economically support their installation as part of a policy reacting to climate change.

== Installation ==
Home fuel cells are designed and built to fit in either an interior mechanical room or outside, running quietly in the background 24/7. Connected to the utility grid through the home's main service panel and using net metering, the home's fuel cells can easily integrate with existing electrical and hydronic systems, and are compliant with utility interconnection requirements. In the event of a grid interruption, the system automatically switches to operate in a grid-independent mode to provide continuous backup power for dedicated circuits in the home while the grid is down. It can also be modified to run off the grid.

=== Current installations ===
Twenty companies have installed Bloom Energy fuel cells in their buildings, including Google, eBay, and FedEx. The CEO of eBay told 60 Minutes in 2010 that they had saved $100,000 in electricity bills in the 9 months since they were installed.

Oregon-based ClearEdge Power had until 2014 installed 5 kW systems at the homes of Jackie Autry, Bay Area Wealth Manager Bruce Raabe and VC investor Gary Dillabough.

A commercially working cell in Japan called Eni-Farm is supported by the regional government, using natural gas to power the fuel cell that then produces electricity and heated water.

In 2013, 64% of global sales of the micro-combined heat and power fuel cell surpassed the conventional mechanical rotary systems in sales in 2012.

=== Life cycle ===
Fuel cells have an average lifetime of around 60,000 hours. For PEM fuel cell units, which shut down at night, this equates to an estimated lifetime of between ten and fifteen years.

== Cost ==
Most home fuel cells are comparable to residential solar energy photovoltaic systems on a dollar-per-watt-installed basis. Some natural gas-driven home fuel cells can generate eight times more energy per year than the same-sized solar installation, even in the best solar locations. For example, a 5 kW home fuel cell produces about 80 MWh of annual combined electricity and heat, compared to approximately 10 MWh generated by a 5 kW solar system. However, these systems are not directly comparable because solar power is a renewable resource with basically no operating cost, while natural gas is neither.

Operating costs for home fuel cells can be as low as 6.0¢ per kWh based on $1.20 per therm for natural gas, assuming full electrical and heat load utilization.

Residential fuel cells can have high initial capital costs . As of December 2012, Panasonic and Tokyo Gas Co., Ltd. sold about 21,000 PEM Eni-Farm units in Japan for a price of $22,600 before installation.

== Incentives ==
In the US, home fuel cells are eligible for substantial incentives and rebates at both the state and federal levels as part of renewable energy policy. For example, the California Self Generation Incentive Program (SGIP) rebate ($2,500 per kW) and Federal Tax Credits ($1,000 per kW residential and $3,000 per kW commercial) significantly reduce the net capital cost to the customer. For businesses, additional cash advantages can be realized from bonuses and accelerated depreciation of fuel cells.

In addition, home fuel cells receive net metering credit in many service areas for any excess electricity generated but not used by putting it back on the utility grid.

The Database of State Incentives for Renewables & Efficiency (DSIRE) provides comprehensive information on state, local, utility, and federal incentives that promote renewable energy and energy efficiency.

=== California ===
In California, in particular, utilities charge higher per kWh rates as energy consumption rises above established baselines, with the top tier set at the highest rates to discourage consumption at those levels. Home fuel cells reduce customer exposure to the top-tier rates, saving homeowners as much as 45% in reduced annual energy costs.

== Market status ==
Home fuel cells represent a new market and a fundamental shift in energy sourcing. An individual home fuel cell system installed in a U.S. residence supports U.S. energy independence. Home fuel cell systems in homes could lessen reliance on public utilities, increase energy efficiency, and reduce US dependence on foreign energy imports. This self-generation of energy in a distributed generation approach would secure and increase US power generating capacity, enabling unused electricity to be sent back to the grids without having to add new power plants and transmission lines.

== See also ==
- Feed-in tariff
- Sustainable energy
