= ENV =

Hydrogen motorcycle

The ENV (Emission Neutral Vehicle) is an electric motorcycle prototype powered by a hydrogen fuel cell. It was developed by Intelligent Energy, a British company.

== Specifications ==
The vehicle and the fuel cell centre respectively weigh approximately 80 and 20 kilograms. It uses a proton-exchange membrane fuel cell to generate about 8 hp or 6 kilowatts. The Discovery Channel has indicated it can reach approximately 80 km/h and, on a full tank may ride continuously for about 4 hours and travel a distance of 160 kilometres. The motorcycle is a preproduction prototype, which was targeted to sell for approximately $6000.

== See also ==
- Hydrogen vehicle
