= Martin Viessmann =

German businessman

- Born: 1953 or 1954 (age 71–72); Germany
- Education: University of Erlangen
- Occupation(s): CEO, Viessmann
- Spouse: Annette Viessmann
- Children: 2

Martin Viessmann (born 1953/54) is a German billionaire businessman, CEO of Viessmann Group, a heating systems manufacturer headquartered in Allendorf, Germany.

== Early life ==
Martin Viessmann is the son of Hans Viessmann and the grandson of Johann Viessmann, who founded Viessmann Group in 1917. He has a diploma from the University of Erlangen.

== Career ==
Viessmann is CEO of the Viessmann Group.

The Manager Magazin listed Viessmann in 51st place on its list of the 500 richest Germans in 2013, with an estimated fortune at 2.15 billion euro (2012: 1.95 billion euro). According to the 2021 Forbes list, Viessmann's fortune is around $1.8 billion. This puts him in 1750th place on the Forbes list of the world's richest people.

== Philanthropy ==
In 2012, Greg Kleinheinz was appointed as the first Viessmann Endowed Chair in Sustainable Technology at the University of Wisconsin Oshkosh, created with an endowment from Viessmann and his wife Annette.

== Honours and awards ==
- Federal Cross of Merit: 1st Class of the Order of Merit of the Federal Republic of Germany, 2004
- Energy Globe Award for Sustainability in the "Air" category, 2012
- Greentech Manager of the Year, 2013
- Handelsblatt Hall of Fame der Familienunternehmen, 2020

== Personal life ==
Viessmann and his wife Annette have two children, Katharina and Maximilian, and live in Allendorf, Germany.
