= Intelligent Energy =

Intelligent Energy Ltd
- Industry: Fuel Cells
- Predecessor: Advanced Power Sources Ltd. (1995) Founders - Philip Mitchell, Paul Adcock, Jon Moore, Anthony Newbold
- Founded: Loughborough, United Kingdom (2001)
- Founder: Harry Bradbury
- Headquarters: Loughborough, United Kingdom
- Area served: Worldwide
- Key people: David Woolhouse, CEO; Chris Dudfield, CTO; Greg Harris, CCO
- Number of employees: 230 (2023)
- Website: intelligent-energy.com

Intelligent Energy is a fuel cell engineering business focused on the development, manufacture and commercialisation of its proton-exchange membrane fuel cell technologies for a range of markets including automotive, stationary power, materials handling equipment and UAVs. Headquartered in the UK with representation in the US, Japan, South Korea, and China.

== History ==
The origins of Intelligent Energy began at Loughborough University in the UK during the late 1980s, when the University became one of Europe's first research and development centres for proton-exchange membrane (PEM) fuel cell technology. In 1995, the UK's first kW-level PEM fuel cell stack was produced by the R&D team. In June of that year, Advanced Power Sources (APS) Ltd was founded as a spin-off from Loughborough University by Paul Adcock, Phil Mitchell, Jon Moore and Anthony Newbold, and was the first company in the UK formed specifically to address the development and commercialisation of PEM fuel cells.

Founded by Harry Bradbury, Intelligent Energy was established in 2001, acquiring Advanced Power Sources Ltd, together with its personnel and fuel cell related intellectual property that originated from research conducted by both APS and Loughborough University into PEM fuel cell technology. This triggered investment and enabled the company to grow its business activities. In March 2005, it launched the ENV, the world's first purpose-built fuel cell motorbike, which gained the company recognition as a Technology Pioneer by the World Economic Forum in 2006. The ENV incorporated the company's air-cooled fuel cell technology hybridised with a battery pack to provide 6kW peak load to the motor to improve performance during spikes in power demand i.e. acceleration.

In 2007, a partnership was announced with Suzuki Motor Corporation to develop hydrogen fuel cells for a range of vehicles. In 2008, Intelligent Energy established the company IE-CHP in a joint venture with SSE plc, to develop fuel cells and other technologies for CHP (Combined Heat and Power) applications. In the same year, Intelligent Energy also produced the power system for the first fuel cell powered crewed flight in conjunction with Boeing. In 2010, its fuel-cell taxi received The Engineer Technology and Innovation Award.

In March 2011, the Suzuki Burgman fuel cell scooter, equipped with Intelligent Energy's fuel cell system, became the first fuel cell vehicle to achieve European Whole Vehicle Type Approval.

In 2012, SMILE FC System Corporation, a joint venture between Intelligent Energy and Suzuki Motor Corporation, was established to develop and manufacture air-cooled fuel cell systems for the automotive and a range of industry sectors. During the same year, a fleet of fuel cell taxis incorporating Intelligent Energy's technology was used during the 2012 London Olympics. Part of the European Union-funded HyTEC (Hydrogen Technologies in European Cities) project launched in 2011, the taxis were used to transport VIP guests of the Mayor of London around the city. In 2013, SMILE FC Corporation announced that it had established a ready-to-scale production line for its fuel cell systems, utilising Intelligent Energy's semi-automated production technology. IE-CHP also received CE certification for its first-generation product, a 10 kWe/12 kWth combined heat and power (CHP) fuel cell. The certification allows the product to be sold in the European Economic Area, confirming that the product satisfies all the EU regulatory and conformity assessment procedures covering the design, manufacture, and testing of the system.

Intelligent Energy was acquired by Meditor Energy, part of the Meditor Group, in October 2017.

In 2018, Intelligent Energy announced the launch of its IE-LIFT 802/804 fuel cell modules for power generation applications such as stationary power, micro-grids, telecoms, and critical infrastructure.

== Technology ==
Intelligent Energy's fuel-cell technology is divided into two platforms: air-cooled (AC) and evaporatively-cooled (EC). The air-cooled fuel cell systems use low-power fans to provide cooling and the oxidant supply for operation. Heat from the fuel cell stack is conducted to cooling plates and removed through airflow channels, a simplified and cost-effective system for the power range from a few watts to several kilowatts. They are used in a wide range of UAV, stationary power and automotive applications for two-wheel and small car range extender applications.

Evaporatively-cooled (EC) fuel cell systems provide power generation from a few kilowatts up to 200kW. Efficient thermal management of the EC fuel cell stack reduces system complexity, mass and cost. These systems are designed for high-volume, low-cost manufacturing, and use modular architecture that can be quickly modified to suit the application.

== Market sectors ==
=== Automotive ===
In 2010, the company was involved in the development of the report entitled "A portfolio of power-trains for Europe: a fact-based analysis. The role of Battery Electric Vehicles, Plug-In Hybrids and Fuel Cell Electric Vehicles", produced by McKinsey & Company with input from car manufacturers, oil and gas suppliers, utilities and industrial gas companies, wind turbine and electrolyser companies as well as governmental and non-governmental organisations. The report concluded, amongst other findings, that fuel cell vehicles are technology ready, and cost competitive, and that decarbonisation targets for Europe are unlikely to be met without the introduction of fuel cell powertrains.

== Membership of industry consortia and trade associations ==
The company is a founding member of UKH_{2} Mobility, a government and industry group aiming to accelerate the commercial roll-out of hydrogen vehicles in 2014/15;

== See also ==
- Electric vehicle
- List of renewable energy topics by country
- Renewable energy commercialization
