= CleanTechnica =

Clean technology news website

- Website type: News
- Available in: English
- Headquarters: California, USA
- Creator: Scott Cooney
- Editor: Zach Shahan
- Revenue: Advertisement, optional subscription
- Website: cleantechnica.com
- Commercial: Yes
- Registration: Optional
- Launched: January 7, 2008; 18 years ago
- Current status: Online

CleanTechnica is a US-based online audio and video media company, that operates a website under the same name, dedicated to aggregating news in clean technology, sustainable energy, and electric vehicles, with a focus on Tesla. It is a privately held company founded in 2008.

== Content ==
CleanTechnica's stories have been cited by Business Insider (on Lindsey Graham), Reuters (on nanotech for energy storage), ThinkProgress (on wind power in Texas), The Washington Post (on suburban living), and Slate (on medical mask stockpiling during the COVID-19 pandemic). ThinkProgress have also published their stories in full.

CleanTechnica has published interviews with people such as the Post Carbon Institute Fellow Richard Heinberg.

== Staff ==
The Chief Editor, main writer and CEO is Zach Shahan.

Apart from its own staff, CleanTechnica have accepted guest contributions from others, such as California Governor (then mayor of San Francisco) Gavin Newsom.
