= Molten carbonate fuel cell =

High-temperature fuel cells

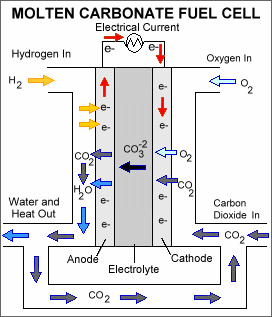
Scheme of a molten-carbonate fuel cell

Molten-carbonate fuel cells (MCFCs) are high-temperature fuel cells that operate at temperatures of 600 °C and above.

Molten carbonate fuel cells (MCFCs) were developed for natural gas, biogas (produced as a result of anaerobic digestion or biomass gasification), and coal-based power plants for electrical utility, industrial, and military applications. MCFCs are high-temperature fuel cells that use an electrolyte composed of a molten carbonate salt mixture suspended in a porous, chemically inert ceramic matrix of beta-alumina solid electrolyte (BASE). Since they operate at extremely high temperatures of 650 °C (roughly 1,200 °F) and above, non-precious metals can be used as catalysts at the anode and cathode, reducing costs.

Improved efficiency is another reason MCFCs offer significant cost reductions over phosphoric acid fuel cells (PAFCs). Molten carbonate fuel cells can reach efficiencies approaching 60%, considerably higher than the 37–42% efficiencies of a phosphoric acid fuel cell plant. When the waste heat is captured and used, overall fuel efficiencies can be as high as 85%.

Unlike alkaline, phosphoric acid, and polymer electrolyte membrane fuel cells, MCFCs don't require an external reformer to convert more energy-dense fuels to hydrogen. Due to the high temperatures at which MCFCs operate, these fuels are converted to hydrogen within the fuel cell itself by a process called internal reforming, which also reduces cost.

Molten carbonate fuel cells are not prone to poisoning by carbon monoxide or carbon dioxide — they can even use carbon oxides as fuel — making them more attractive for fueling with gases made from coal. Because they are more resistant to impurities than other fuel cell types, scientists believe that they could even be capable of internal reforming of coal, assuming they can be made resistant to impurities such as sulfur and particulates that result from converting coal, a dirtier fossil fuel source than many others, into hydrogen. Alternatively, because MCFCs require CO_{2} be delivered to the cathode along with the oxidizer, they can be used to electrochemically separate carbon dioxide from the flue gas of other fossil fuel power plants for sequestration.

The primary disadvantage of current MCFC technology is durability. The high temperatures at which these cells operate and the corrosive electrolyte used accelerate component breakdown and corrosion, decreasing cell life. Scientists are currently exploring corrosion-resistant materials for components as well as fuel cell designs that increase cell life without decreasing performance.

== Operation ==
=== Background ===
Molten carbonate FCs are a recently developed type of fuel cell that targets small and large energy distribution/generation systems since their power production is in the 0.3–3 MW range. The operating pressure is between 1–8 atm while the temperatures are between 600 and 700 °C. Due to the production of CO_{2} during reforming of the fossil fuel (methane, natural gas), MCFCs are not a completely green technology, but are promising due to their reliability and efficiency (sufficient heat for co-generation with electricity). Current MCFC efficiencies range from 60 to 70%.

=== Reactions ===
Internal Reformer (methane example)	$\ce{CH4 + H2O <=> 3H2 + CO}$
Anode (hydrogen example)	$\ce{H2 + CO3^{2-} <=> H2O + CO2 + 2e-}$
Cathode	$\ce{\frac{1}{2}O2 + CO2 + 2e- <=> CO3^{2-}}$
Cell	$\ce{H2 + \frac{1}{2}O2 <=> H2O}$
Nernst Equation	$E = E^o + \frac{RT}{2F}\log\frac{P_\ce{H2}P_\ce{O2}^{\frac{1}{2}}}{P_\ce{H2O}}+\frac{RT}{2F}\log\frac{P_\ce{CO2,cathode}}{P_\ce{CO2,anode}}$

=== Materials ===
Due to the high operating temperatures of MCFCs, the materials need to be very carefully selected to survive the conditions present within the cell. The following sections cover the various materials present in the fuel cell and recent developments in research.

==== Anode ====
The anode material typically consists of a porous (3–6 μm, 45–70% material porosity) Ni based alloy. Ni is alloyed with either Chromium or Aluminum in the 2–10% range. These alloying elements allow for formation of LiCrO_{2}/LiAlO_{2} at the grain boundaries, which increases the materials' creep resistance and prevents sintering of the anode at the high operating temperatures of the fuel cell. Recent research has looked at using nano Ni and other Ni alloys to increase the performance and decrease the operating temperature of the fuel cell. A reduction in operating temperature would extend the lifetime of the fuel cell (i.e. decrease corrosion rate) and allow for use of cheaper component materials. At the same time, a decrease in temperature would decrease ionic conductivity of the electrolyte and thus, the anode materials need to compensate for this performance decline (e.g. by increasing power density). Other researchers have looked into enhancing creep resistance by using a Ni_{3}Al alloy anode to reduce mass transport of Ni in the anode when in operation.

==== Cathode ====
On the other side of the cell, the cathode material is composed of either Lithium metatitanate or of a porous Ni that is converted to a lithiated nickel oxide (lithium is intercalated within the NiO crystal structure). The pore size within the cathode is in the range of 7–15 μm with 60–70% of the material being porous. The primary issue with the cathode material is dissolution of NiO since it reacts with CO_{2} when the cathode is in contact with the carbonate electrolyte. This dissolution leads to precipitation of Ni metal in the electrolyte and since it is electrically conductive, the fuel cell can get short circuited. Therefore, current studies have looked into the addition of MgO to the NiO cathode to limit this dissolution. Magnesium oxide serves to reduce the solubility of Ni^{2+} in the cathode and decreases precipitation in the electrolyte. Alternatively, replacement of the conventional cathode material with a LiFeO_{2}-LiCoO_{2}-NiO alloy has shown promising performance results and almost completely avoids the problem of Ni dissolution of the cathode.

==== Electrolyte ====
MCFCs use a liquid electrolyte (molten carbonate) which consists of a sodium(Na) and potassium(K) carbonate. This electrolyte is supported by a ceramic (LiAlO_{2}) matrix to contain the liquid between the electrodes. The high temperatures of the fuel cell is required to produce sufficient ionic conductivity of carbonate through this electrolyte. Common MCFC electrolytes contain 62% Li_{2}CO_{3} and 38% K_{2}CO_{3}. A greater fraction of Li carbonate is used due to its higher ionic conductivity but is limited to 62% due to its lower gas solubility and ionic diffusivity of oxygen. In addition, Li_{2}CO_{3} is a very corrosive electrolyte and this ratio of carbonates provides the lowest corrosion rate.

Because of these issues, recent studies have delved into replacing the potassium carbonate with a sodium carbonate. A Li/Na electrolyte has shown to have better performance (higher conductivity) and improves the stability of the cathode when compared to a Li/K electrolyte (Li/K is more basic). In addition, scientists have also looked into modifying the matrix of the electrolyte to prevent issues such as phase changes (γ-LiAlO_{2} to α-LiAlO_{2}) in the material during cell operation. The phase change accompanies a volume decrease in the electrolyte which leads to lower ionic conductivity. Through various studies, it has been found that an alumina doped α-LiAlO_{2} matrix would improve the phase stability while maintaining the fuel cell's performance.

== MTU fuel cell ==
The German company MTU Friedrichshafen presented an MCFC at the Hannover Fair in 2006. The unit weighs 2 tonnes and can produce 240 kW of electric power from various gaseous fuels, including biogas. If fueled by fuels that contain carbon such as natural gas, the exhaust will contain CO_{2} but will be reduced by up to 50% compared to diesel engines running on marine bunker fuel. The exhaust temperature is 400 °C, hot enough to be used for many industrial processes. Another possibility is to make more electric power via a steam turbine. Depending on feed gas type, the electric efficiency is between 12% and 19%. A steam turbine can increase the efficiency by up to 24%. The unit can be used for cogeneration.

== See also ==
- FuelCell Energy — Connecticut company that develops natural gas fuel cells
- Glossary of fuel cell terms
- Hydrogen technologies
