= Stationary fuel-cell applications =

Stationary fuel-cell applications (or stationary fuel-cell power systems) are applications for fuel cells that are either connected to the electric grid (distributed generation) to provide supplemental power and as emergency power system for critical areas, or installed as a grid-independent generator for on-site service.

== Applications ==
In 2012 more than 45700 fuel-cell systems were shipped all over the world — in residential homes, hospitals, nursing homes, hotels, office buildings, schools, utility power plants.

=== (Micro)combined heat and power ===
Micro combined heat and power, "mCHP" or "micro cogeneration" is a so-called distributed energy resource (DER). The installation is usually less than 5 kW_{e} in a house or small business. Instead of burning fuel to merely heat space or water, some of the energy is converted to electricity in addition to heat. This electricity can be used within the home or business or, if permitted by the grid management, sold back into the electric power grid.

Delta-ee consultants stated in 2013 that with 64% of global sales the fuel cell micro-combined heat and power passed the conventional systems in sales in 2012. In 2012, over 20000 units were sold in Japan as part of the Ene Farm project. With a Lifetime of around 60,000 hours. For PEM fuel cell units, which shut down at night, this equates to an estimated lifetime of between ten and fifteen years. For a price of $22,600 before installation. For 2013 a state subsidy for 50000 units is in place.

=== Emergency power systems ===
Emergency power systems are a type of fuel cell system, which may include lighting, generators and other apparatus, to provide backup resources in a crisis or when regular systems fail. They find uses in a wide variety of settings from residential homes to hospitals, scientific laboratories, data centers, telecommunication equipment and modern naval ships.

=== Uninterrupted power supply ===
An uninterruptible power supply (UPS) provides emergency power and, depending on the topology, provide line regulation as well to connected equipment by supplying power from a separate source when utility power is not available. It differs from an auxiliary power supply or standby generator, which does not provide instant protection from a momentary power interruption.

== Codes and standards ==
Stationary fuel cell applications is a classification in FC hydrogen codes and standards and fuel cell codes and standards. The other main standards are Portable fuel cell applications and Fuel cell vehicle.

- Fuel cell gas appliances up to 70 kW
- Installation permitting guidance for hydrogen and fuel cells stationary applications
- Standard for the installation of stationary fuel cell power systems

== See also ==
- Glossary of fuel cell terms
