= Ceres Power =

British electrochemical technology licencing company

Ceres Power Holdings plc
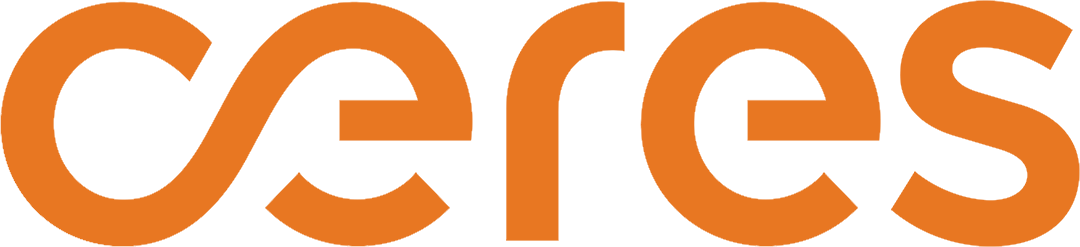
- Company type: Public
- Traded as: LSE: CWR
- Industry: Alternative Energy
- Founded: 2001
- Headquarters: Horsham, England, UK
- Key people: Warren Finegold, Chair; Phil Caldwell, CEO
- Revenue: ▼£32.6 million (2025)
- Operating income: ▼£(47.6) million (2025)
- Net income: ▼£(47.6) million (2025)
- Website: www.ceres.tech

Ceres Power Holdings plc is a UK developer of solid oxide electrolyzer cell and solid oxide fuel cell technology for use in distributed power systems aimed at decarbonising cities, factories, data centres and electric vehicle charging. Founded in 2001, it is headquartered at Horsham in the UK. It is listed on the London Stock Exchange and is a constituent of the FTSE 250 Index.

It is also classified by the LSE Green Economy Mark, which recognises listed companies that derive more than 50% of their activity from the green economy.

== History ==
Ceres Power spun-out from Imperial College London, after more than 10 years of fundamental research led by Professor Brian Steele, in 2001. The company was first listed on the London Stock Exchange in November 2004.

Phil Caldwell became the CEO of Ceres Power in September 2013, following investment from IP Group. In June 2023, Ceres marked its move from the Alternative Investment Market to the Main Market of the London Stock Exchange.

The company issued an unexpected revenue warning in December 2023: contract negotiations were taking longer than expected. Further difficulties emerged in March 2025 when Bosch announced that it was withdrawing from a joint venture with the company.

== Technology ==
=== Ceres Steel Cell ===
The Ceres patented Steel Cell is a Solid oxide fuel cell (SOFC) that can operate on mains natural gas for distributed power generation. The technology is reversible. In one direction it can generate electricity from multiple fuels; in the other, it can generate green hydrogen at low cost and high efficiencies.

=== Hydrogen ===
The UK Hydrogen Strategy cites UK companies including ITM Power, Johnson Matthey and Ceres as being at the forefront of hydrogen technology development worldwide. Ceres is a founding member of the Long Duration Energy Storage Council.

== Business Model ==
Ceres operates a licensing business model and partners with global industry partners to develop clean energy systems and products. Partners include Weichai, Doosan, and Shell.

== Awards ==
In July 2023, Ceres was awarded the 2023 MacRobert Award by the Royal Academy of Engineering. In its award citation, the academy recognised Ceres for its "ground-breaking fuel cell technology that promises to make a major contribution to decarbonising the world at the scale and pace required to save the planet." In 2021 Ceres was awarded the Queen’s Award for Enterprise 2021 in the category of International Trade.
