= Alkaline anion-exchange membrane fuel cell =

An alkaline anion-exchange membrane fuel cell (AAEMFC), also known as anion-exchange membrane fuel cells (AEMFCs), alkaline membrane fuel cells (AMFCs), hydroxide-exchange membrane fuel cells (HEMFCs), or solid alkaline fuel cells (SAFCs) is a type of alkaline fuel cell that uses an anion-exchange membrane to separate the anode and cathode compartments.

Alkaline fuel cells (AFCs) are based on the transport of alkaline anions, usually hydroxide OH^{−}, between the electrodes. Original AFCs used aqueous potassium hydroxide (KOH) as an electrolyte. The AAEMFCs use instead a polymer membrane that transports hydroxide anions.

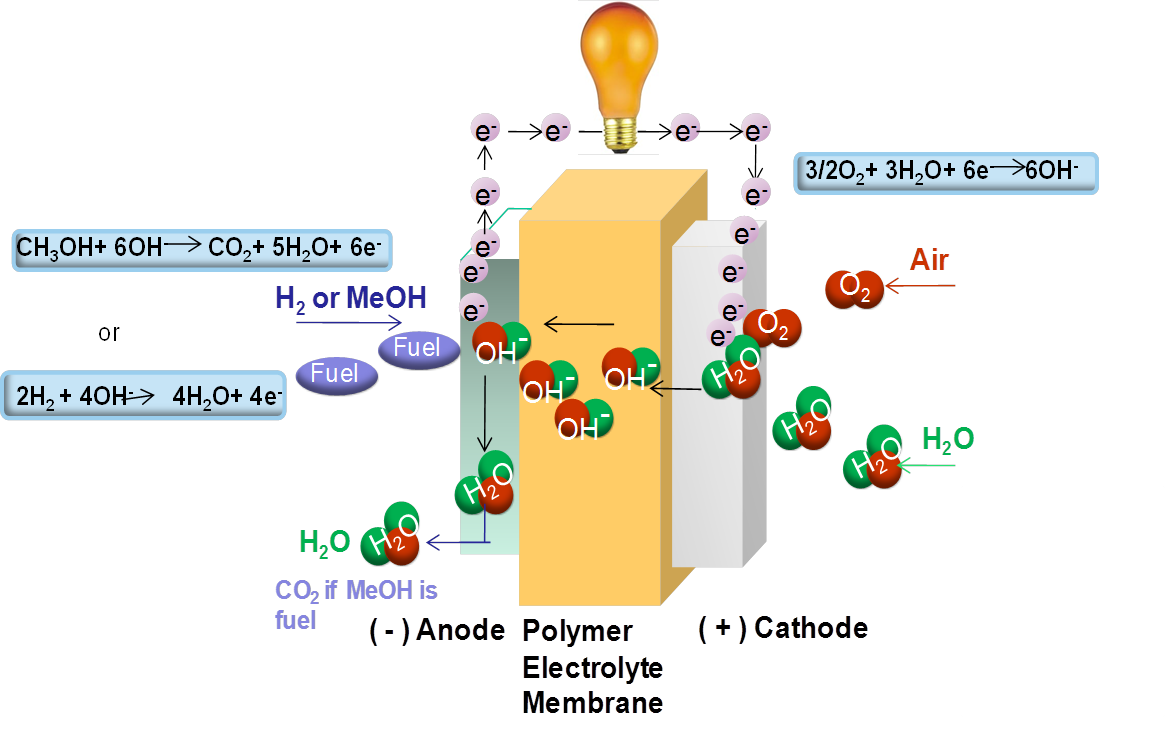
Alkaline Anion-Exchange Membrane Fuel Cell

== Mechanism ==
In an AAEMFC, the fuel, hydrogen or methanol, is supplied at the anode and oxygen through air, and water are supplied at cathode. Fuel is oxidized at anode and oxygen is reduced at cathode. At cathode, oxygen reduction produces hydroxides ions (OH^{−}) that migrate through the electrolyte towards the anode. At anode, hydroxide ions react with the fuel to produce water and electrons. Electrons go through the circuit producing current.

Electrochemical reactions when hydrogen is the fuel:

At Anode: H_{2} + 2OH^{−} → 2H_{2}O + 2e^{−}

At cathode: O_{2} + 2H_{2}O + 4e^{−} → 4OH^{−}

Electrochemical reactions when methanol is the fuel:

At anode: CH_{3}OH + 6OH^{−} → CO_{2} + 5H_{2}O + 6e-

At cathode: 3/2O_{2} + 3H_{2}O + 6e^{−} → 6OH^{−}

== Mechanical properties ==
=== Measuring mechanical properties ===
The mechanical properties of anion-exchange membranes are relevant for use in electrochemical energy technologies such as polymer electrolyte membranes in fuel cells. Mechanical properties of polymers include the elastic modulus, tensile strength, and ductility. Traditional tensile stress-strain test used to measure these properties are very sensitive to the experimental procedure because the mechanical properties of polymers are heavily dependent on the nature of the environment such as the presence of water, organic solvents, oxygen, and temperature. Increasing the temperature generally results in a decrease of elastic modulus, a reduction of tensile strength, and an increase of ductility, assuming there is no modification of the microstructure. Near the glass transition temperature, very significant changes in mechanical properties are observed. Dynamic Mechanical Analysis (DMA) is a widely used complimentary, characterization technique for measuring the mechanical properties of polymers including the storage modulus and loss modulus as functions of temperature.

=== Methods of Increasing Mechanical Properties ===
One method of increasing the mechanical properties of polymers used for anion-exchange membranes (AEM) is substituting conventional ternary amine and anion exchange groups with grafted quaternary groups. These ionomers results in large storage and Young's moduli, a high tensile strength, and high ductility. Exchanging the counterion from hydroxide to hydrogen carbonate, carbonate, and chloride ions further enhances the strength and elastic modulus of the membranes. Narducci and colleagues concluded that the water uptake, related to the type of anion, plays a very important role for the mechanical properties. Zhang and colleagues prepared a series of robust and crosslinked poly(2,6-dimethyl-1,4-phenylene oxide)s (PPO) AEMs with chemically stable imidazolium cations through quaternization of C1, C3, C4-substituted imidazole and crosslinking them via "thiol-ene" chemistry. These crosslinked AEMs showed excellent film forming properties and exhibited a higher tensile strength owing to the increased entanglement interactions in the polymer chains which in turn increased the water up take. This strong relation between water uptake and mechanical properties mirrors the findings of Narducci and colleagues. The findings of Zhang et al. suggest that the crosslinking of anion conductive materials with stable sterically protected organic cations is an effective strategy to produce robust AEMs for use in alkaline fuel cells.

== Comparison with traditional alkaline fuel cell ==
The alkaline fuel cell used by NASA in 1960s for Apollo and Space Shuttle program generated electricity at nearly 70% efficiency using aqueous solution of KOH as an electrolyte. In that situation, CO_{2} coming in through oxidant air stream and generated as by product from oxidation of methanol, if methanol is the fuel, reacts with electrolyte KOH forming CO_{3}^{2−}/HCO_{3}^{−}. Unfortunately as a consequence, K_{2}CO_{3} or KHCO_{3} precipitate on the electrodes. However, this effect has found to be mitigated by the removal of cationic counterions from the electrode, and carbonate formation has been found to be entirely reversible by several industrial and academic groups, most notably Varcoe. Low-cost CO_{2} systems have been developed using air as the oxidant source. In alkaline anion-exchange membrane fuel cell, aqueous KOH is replaced with a solid polymer electrolyte membrane, that can conduct hydroxide ions. This could overcome the problems of electrolyte leakage and carbonate precipitation, though still taking advantage of benefits of operating a fuel cell in an alkaline environment. In AAEMFCs, CO_{2} reacts with water forming H_{2}CO_{3}, which further dissociate to HCO_{3}^{−} and CO_{3}^{2−}. The equilibrium concentration of CO_{3}^{2−}/HCO_{3}^{−} is less than 0.07% and there is no precipitation on the electrodes in the absence of cations (K^{+}, Na^{+}). The absence of cations is, however, difficult to achieve, as most membranes are conditioned to functional hydroxide or bicarbonate forms out of their initial, chemically stable halogen form, and may significantly impact fuel cell performance by both competitively adsorbing to active sites and exerting Helmholtz-layer effects.

In comparison, against alkaline fuel cell, alkali anion-exchange membrane fuel cells also protect the electrode from solid carbonate precipitation, which can cause fuel (oxygen/hydrogen) transport problem during start-up.

The large majority of membranes/ionomer that have been developed are fully hydrocarbon, allowing for much easier catalyst recycling and lower fuel crossover. Methanol has an advantage of easier storage and transportation and has higher volumetric energy density compared to hydrogen. Also, methanol crossover from anode to cathode is reduced in AAEMFCs compared to PEMFCs, due to the opposite direction of ion transport in the membrane, from cathode to anode. In addition, use of higher alcohols such as ethanol and propanol is possible in AAEMFCs, since anode potential in AAEMFCs is sufficient to oxidize C-C bonds present in alcohols.

=== Challenges ===
The biggest challenge in developing AAEMFCs is the anion-exchange membrane (AEM). A typical AEM is composed of a polymer backbone with tethered cationic ion-exchange groups to facilitate the movement of free OH^{−} ions. This is the inverse of Nafion used for PEMFCs, where an anion is covalently attached to the polymer and protons hop from one site to another. The challenge is to fabricate AEM with high OH^{−} ion conductivity and mechanical stability without chemical deterioration at elevated pH and temperatures. The main mechanisms of degradation are Hofmann elimination when β-hydrogens are present and direct nucleophilic attack by OH^{−} ion at the cationic site. One approach towards improving the chemical stability towards Hofmann elimination is to remove all β-hydrogens at the cationic site. All these degradation reactions limit the polymer backbone chemistries and the cations that can be incorporated for developing AEM.

Another challenge is achieving OH^{−} ion conductivity comparable to H^{+} conductivity observed in PEMFCs. Since the diffusion coefficient of OH^{−} ions is half that of H^{+} (in bulk water), a higher concentration of OH^{−} ions is needed to achieve similar results, which in turn needs higher ion-exchange capacity of the polymer. However, high ion-exchange capacity leads to excessive swelling of polymer on hydration and concomitant loss of mechanical properties.

Management of water in AEMFCs has also been shown to be a challenge. Recent research has shown that careful balancing of the humidity of the feed gases significantly improves fuel cell performance.

== See also ==
- Anion exchange membrane electrolysis
- Proton-exchange membrane
