= FuelCell Energy =

U.S.-based fuel cell company

FuelCell Energy, Inc.
- Type: Public
- Traded as: Nasdaq: FCEL; Russell 2000 Index component
- ISIN: US35952H6018
- Industry: Renewable energy, Fuel cells, Carbon capture and energy storage
- Founded: 1969; 57 years ago
- Headquarters: Danbury, Connecticut, United States
- Key people: Jason Few (CEO and president)
- Revenue: US$70.87 million (as of 2021)
- Website: www.fuelcellenergy.com

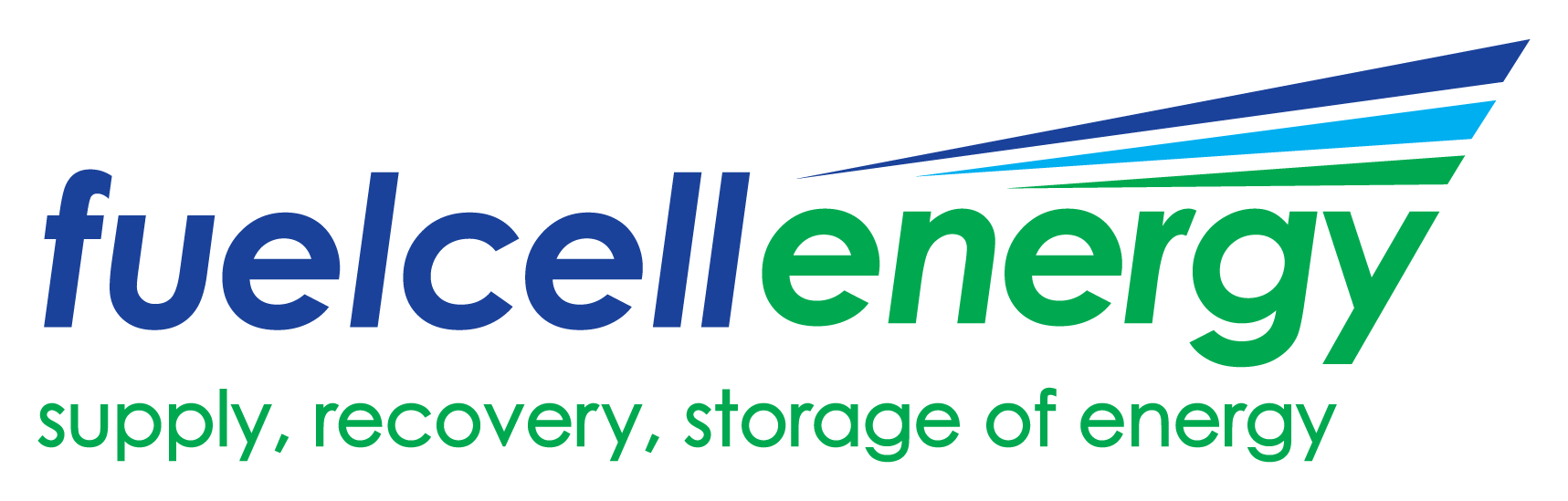
Former logo

FuelCell Energy, Inc. is a publicly traded fuel cell company headquartered in Danbury, Connecticut. It designs, manufactures, operates and services power plants based on molten carbonate fuel cells.

The company operates the Gyeonggi Green Energy Fuel cell park, which provides 59 megawatt of electricity plus district heating to a number of customers in South Korea. It also operates a fuel cell park of five 2.8 MW power plants and a rankine cycle turbine bottoming cycle in Bridgeport, Connecticut.

== History ==
The company was founded as Energy Research Corporation (ERC) in 1969 by chemical engineers Bernard Baker and Martin Klein. From the 1970s to 1990s, with sponsorship from U.S. military and other utility companies, the company extended to low-temperature fuel cell area and high-temperature carbonate fuel systems.

It completed its IPO in 1992 and was renamed as FuelCell Energy, Inc. It spun off its battery division, Evercel, in 1999. FuelCell Energy began expanding globally in 2007 through a partnership with POSCO Energy, targeting markets in Asia, particularly South Korea, but the company announced the termination of the partnership in 2020.

In 2012, the company's European facility was established with German-based FuelCell Energy Solutions, GmbH. In the same year, it completed a joint venture with Fraunhofer IKTS and acquired Versa Power Systems, Inc.

Beginning in 2012, FuelCell entered into a partnership with ExxonMobil to remove carbon dioxide from the exhaust of Exxon's power plants for carbon capture and sequestration (CCS). In 2019, the two companies renewed their joint-development agreement.

In 2017 FuelCell entered an agreement with Toyota to develop a 2.25 MW facility at Long Beach, California. Also in 2017, FuelCell was tapped by the Office of Naval Research to provide assistance on the Large Displacement Unmanned Undersea Vehicle (LDUUV) program.

In 2018, FuelCell Energy earned a $1.5 million research grant from the U.S. Department of Energy (DOE) to develop the company's fuel cell technology to aid the nuclear industry by converting excess power back into hydrogen. That same year, FuelCell began the construction of two plants in Hartford and New Britain as part of a clean energy procurement process for the Connecticut Department of Energy and Environmental Protection (DEEP).

In November 2018, FuelCell acquired a 14.9-MW fuel cell project in Bridgeport, Connecticut from Dominion Energy for $37 million. FuelCell had developed, built and been operating the plant since 2013. The plant is powered by five FuelCell stationary fuel cell power plants and an organic rankine turbine that converts heat from the fuel cells into additional electricity, which is sold to Connecticut Light & Power.

In 2019, FuelCell entered an agreement with Drax Power Station in the UK to study the use of the company's carbonate fuel cells to capture carbon dioxide emissions from Drax's biomass boilers. In August 2019, Jason Few was named FuelCell's new president and CEO.

In May 2021, the company obtained $8 million from the DOE for solid oxide fuel cell (SOFC) technology development.

In June 2021, FuelCell completed construction on a project with the city of San Bernardino Municipal Water Department (SBMWD) where a fuel cell treats anaerobic digester gas to produce electricity and thermal energy.

== Products and services ==
The company today has fuel cell projects that run on natural gas and biogas. The cells can produce hydrogen in addition to power and thermal energy. Additionally, the company is developing fuel cell-based carbon capture, long-duration energy storage and solid-oxide based electrolysis.

FuelCell's proprietary technology uses carbonate fuel cells to capture and concentrate carbon dioxide from large industrial sources. Combustion exhaust is directed to the fuel cell, which produces power while capturing and concentrating carbon dioxide for permanent storage.
