= HES =

Hes or HES may refer to:

- Harry Edward Styles
- Environment, health and safety
- Harbour Air Seaplanes, a Canadian airline
- Harvard Extension School
- Health Survey for England
- Hermiston Municipal Airport in Oregon, United States
- HES School of Economics and Business, in Amsterdam, Netherlands
- Hessle railway station, in England
- Hirschfeld Eddy Foundation, German human rights foundation for LGBTIQ
- Historic Environment Scotland
- Historical European swordsmanship
- Home Energy Saver, an online home energy analysis tool
- Home Energy Station
- Home Entertainment Suppliers
- Homosexualités et Socialisme, a faction within the Parti Socialiste in France
- Hospital Episode Statistics, an NHS database in England
- Huayu Enrichment Scholarship, in Taiwan
- Human embryonic stem cell
- Human Engineered Software, an early 1980s American video game publisher
- Hydroxyethyl starch
- Hypereosinophilic syndrome
- Hypertext Editing System
- Isis, an Egyptian goddess
- Vilém Heš (1860-1908), Czech operatic bass
- Habbo Evolution Soccer
- Hybrid Energy Saving
- House exchange system, in telecommunications
