= Fuel cell vehicle =

Vehicle that uses a fuel cell to power its electric motor

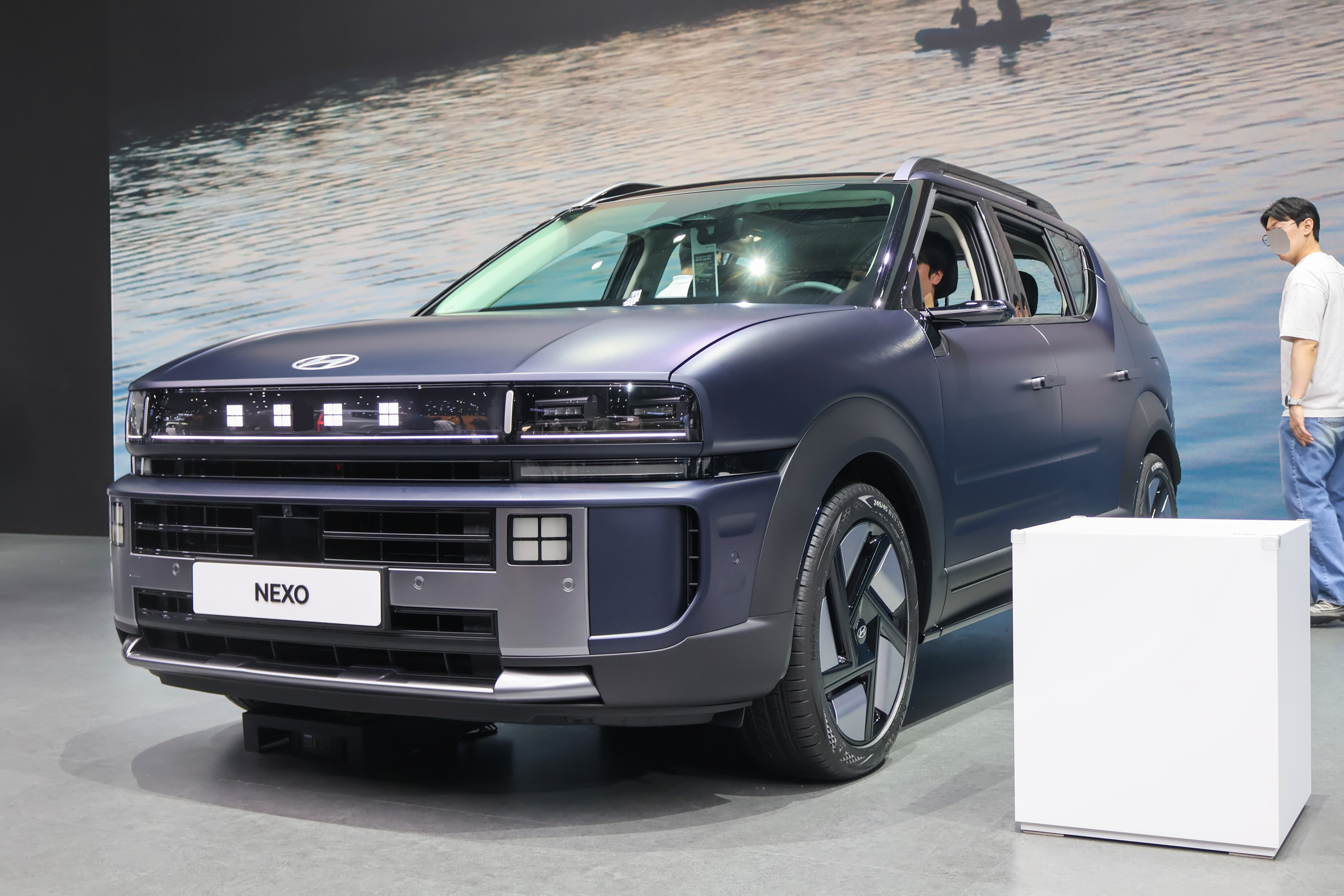
The second generation Hyundai Nexo shown at Seoul Mobility Show 2025

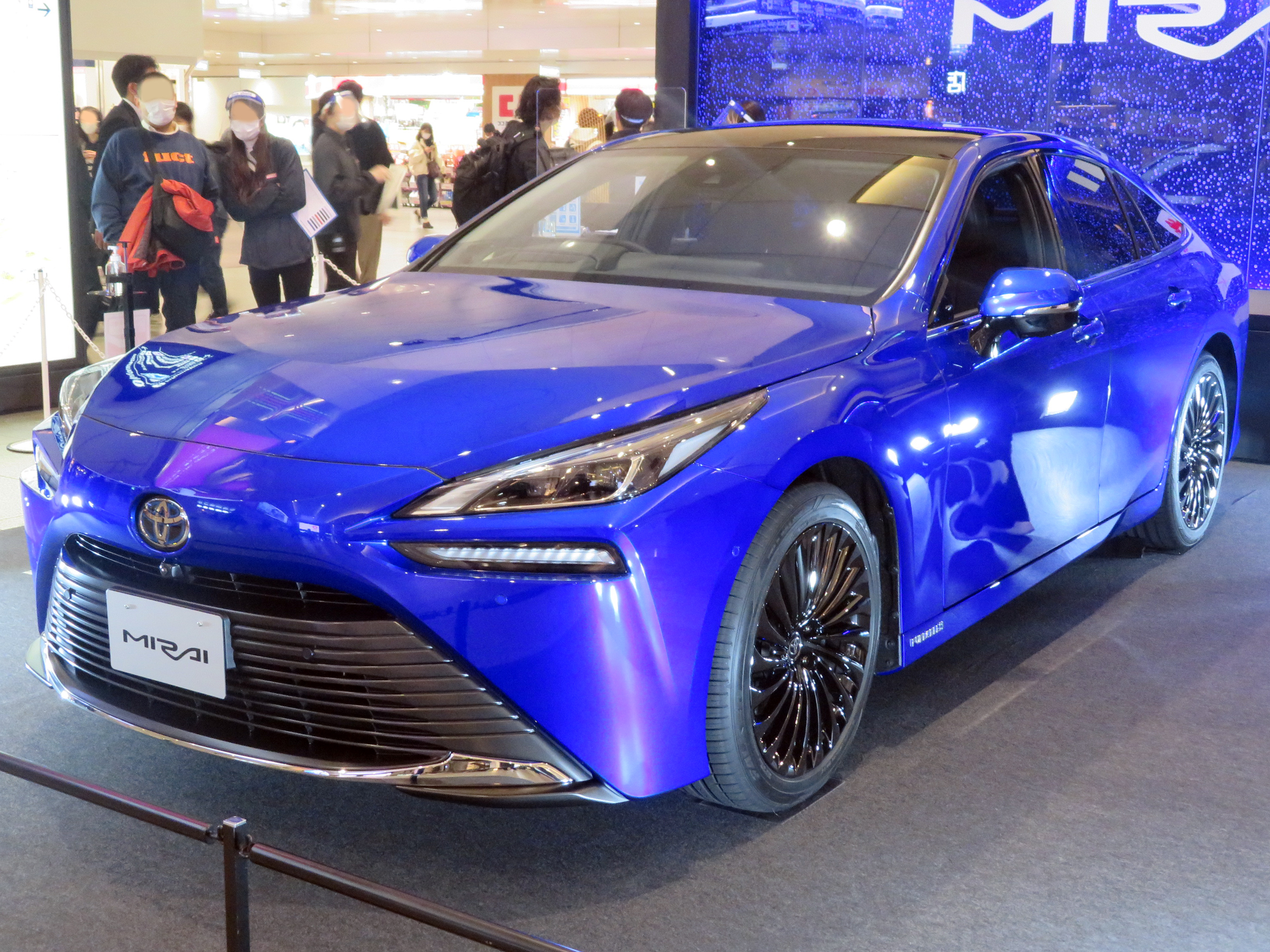
2021 Toyota Mirai

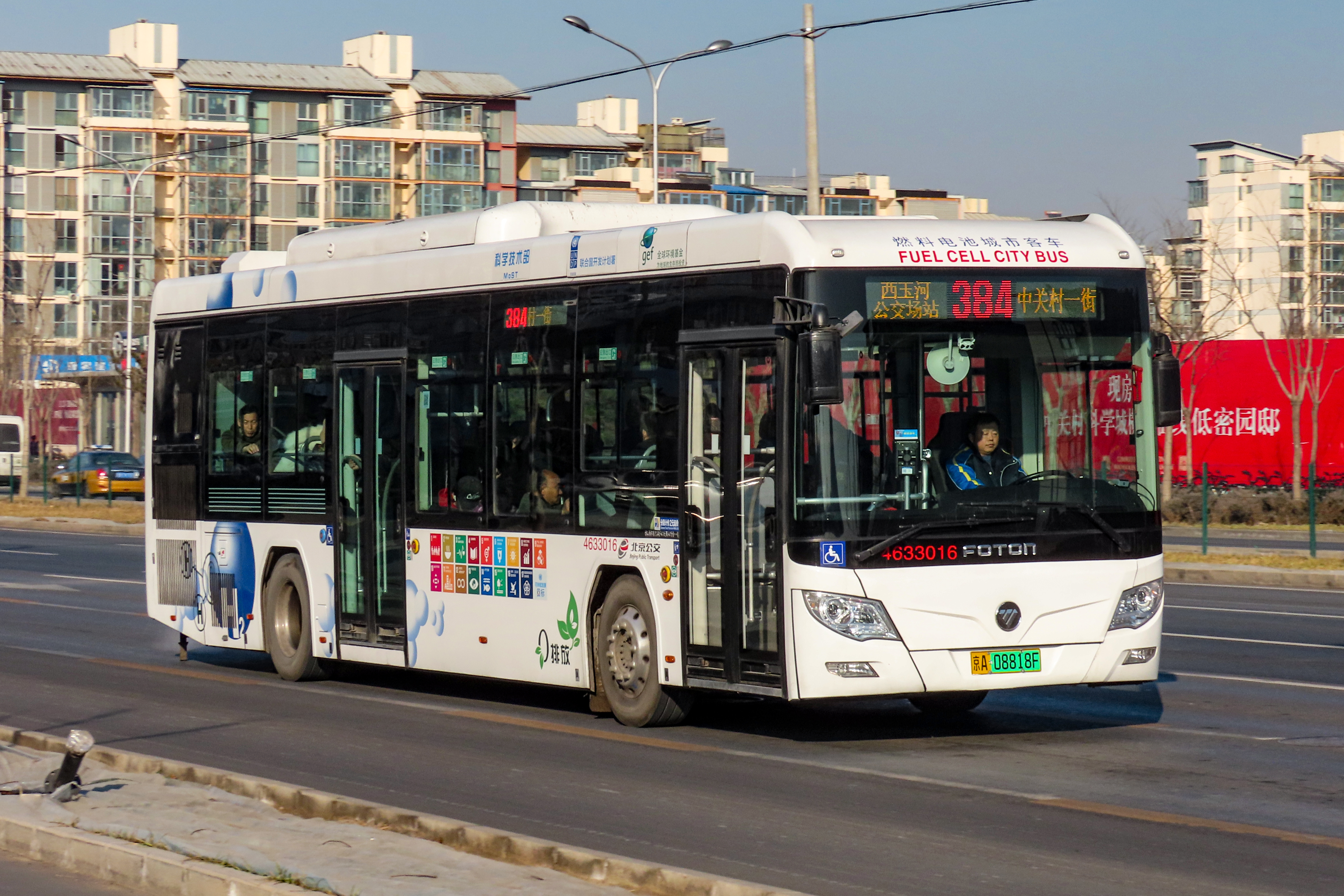
Foton BJ6123FCEVCH-1 fuel cell bus in operation

A fuel cell vehicle (FCV) or fuel cell electric vehicle (FCEV) is an electric vehicle that uses a fuel cell, sometimes in combination with a small battery or supercapacitor, to power its onboard electric motor. Fuel cells in vehicles generate electricity generally using oxygen from the air and compressed hydrogen. Most fuel cell vehicles are classified as zero-emissions vehicles. As compared with internal combustion vehicles, hydrogen vehicles centralize pollutants at the site of the hydrogen production, where hydrogen is typically derived from reformed natural gas. Transporting and storing hydrogen may also create pollutants. Fuel cells have been used in various kinds of vehicles including forklifts, especially in indoor applications where their clean emissions are important to air quality, and in space applications. Fuel cells are being developed and tested in trucks, buses, boats, ships, motorcycles and bicycles, among other kinds of vehicles.

The first road vehicle powered by a fuel cell was the Chevrolet Electrovan, introduced by General Motors in 1966. The Toyota FCHV and Honda FCX, which began leasing on December 2, 2002, became the world's first government-certified commercial fuel cell vehicles, and the Honda FCX Clarity, which began leasing in 2008, was the world's first fuel cell vehicle designed for mass production rather than adapting an existing model. In 2013, Hyundai Motors began production of the Hyundai ix35 FCEV, claimed to be the world's first mass-produced fuel cell electric vehicle, which was subsequently introduced to the market as a lease-only vehicle. In 2014, Toyota began selling the Toyota Mirai, the world's first dedicated fuel cell vehicle.

As of December 2020, 31,225 passenger FCEVs powered with hydrogen had been sold worldwide. As of 2021, there were only two models of fuel cell cars publicly available in select markets: the Toyota Mirai (2014–present) and the Hyundai Nexo (2018–present). The Honda Clarity was produced from 2016 to 2021, when it was discontinued. The Honda CR-V e:FCEV became available, for lease only, in very limited quantities in 2024. As of 2020, there was limited hydrogen infrastructure, with fewer than fifty hydrogen fueling stations for automobiles publicly available in the U.S. Critics doubt whether hydrogen will be efficient or cost-effective for automobiles, as compared with other zero-emission technologies, and in 2019, The Motley Fool opined: "What's tough to dispute is that the hydrogen fuel cell dream is all but dead for the passenger vehicle market."

A significant number of the public hydrogen fuel stations in California are not able to dispense hydrogen. In 2024, Mirai owners filed a class action lawsuit in California over the lack of availability of hydrogen available for fuel cell electric cars, alleging, among other things, fraudulent concealment and misrepresentation as well as violations of California’s false advertising law and breaches of implied warranty.

== Description and purpose of fuel cells in vehicles ==
All fuel cells are made up of three parts: an electrolyte, an anode and a cathode. In principle, a hydrogen fuel cell functions like a battery, producing electricity, which can run an electric motor. Instead of requiring recharging, however, the fuel cell can be refilled with hydrogen. Different types of fuel cells include polymer electrolyte membrane (PEM) Fuel Cells, direct methanol fuel cells, phosphoric acid fuel cells, molten carbonate fuel cells, solid oxide fuel cells, reformed methanol fuel cell and Regenerative Fuel Cells.

== History ==
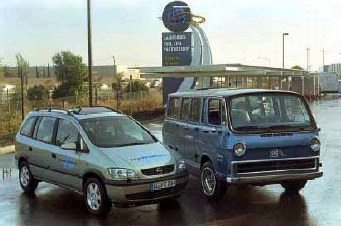
1966 GM Electrovan

The concept of the fuel cell was first demonstrated by Humphry Davy in 1801, but the invention of the first working fuel cell is credited to chemist, lawyer, and physicist William Grove. Grove's experiments with what he called a "gas voltaic battery" showed in 1842 that an electric current could be produced by an electrochemical reaction between hydrogen and oxygen over a platinum catalyst. English engineer Francis Thomas Bacon expanded on Grove's work, developing and demonstrating various alkaline fuel cells between 1939 and 1959.

The first modern fuel cell vehicle was a modified Allis-Chalmers farm tractor fitted with a 15-kilowatt fuel cell in approximately 1959. The Cold War Space Race drove further development of the technology. Project Gemini tested fuel cells to provide electrical power during crewed space missions, and development continued through the Apollo program, where the electrical power systems in the Apollo capsules and lunar modules used alkali fuel cells. In 1966, General Motors developed the first fuel cell road vehicle, the Chevrolet Electrovan. It used a PEM fuel cell, had a range of 120 miles (190 km), and reached a top speed of 70 miles per hour (110 km/h). The vehicle seated only two people, as the fuel cell stack and large hydrogen and oxygen tanks occupied the rear compartment; only one was constructed due to high costs.

General Electric and other companies continued developing PEM fuel cells in the 1970s. Fuel cell stacks remained largely confined to aerospace applications in the 1980s, including the Space Shuttle. Following the conclusion of the Apollo program, many industry specialists transferred to private enterprise. Automotive manufacturers began developing demonstration fuel cell vehicles during the 1990s. In 2001, the first 700 bar (10,000 psi) hydrogen storage tanks were demonstrated, reducing onboard tank volume and increasing vehicle range.

== Applications ==
There are fuel cell vehicles for all modes of transport. The most prevalent fuel cell vehicles are cars, buses, forklifts and material handling vehicles.

=== Automobiles ===
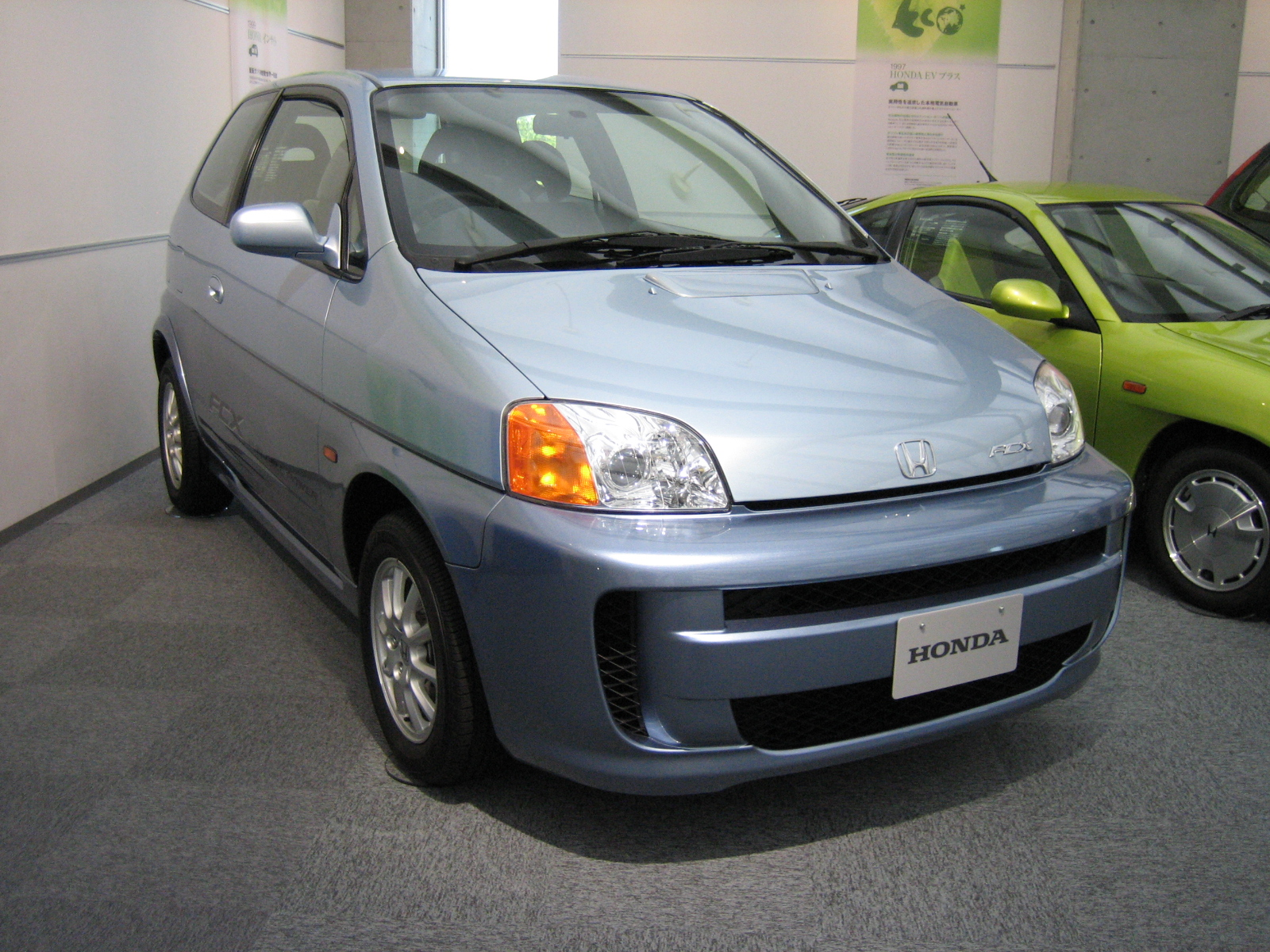
The Honda FCX, along with the Toyota FCHV, is the world's first government-certified commercial hydrogen fuel cell vehicle.

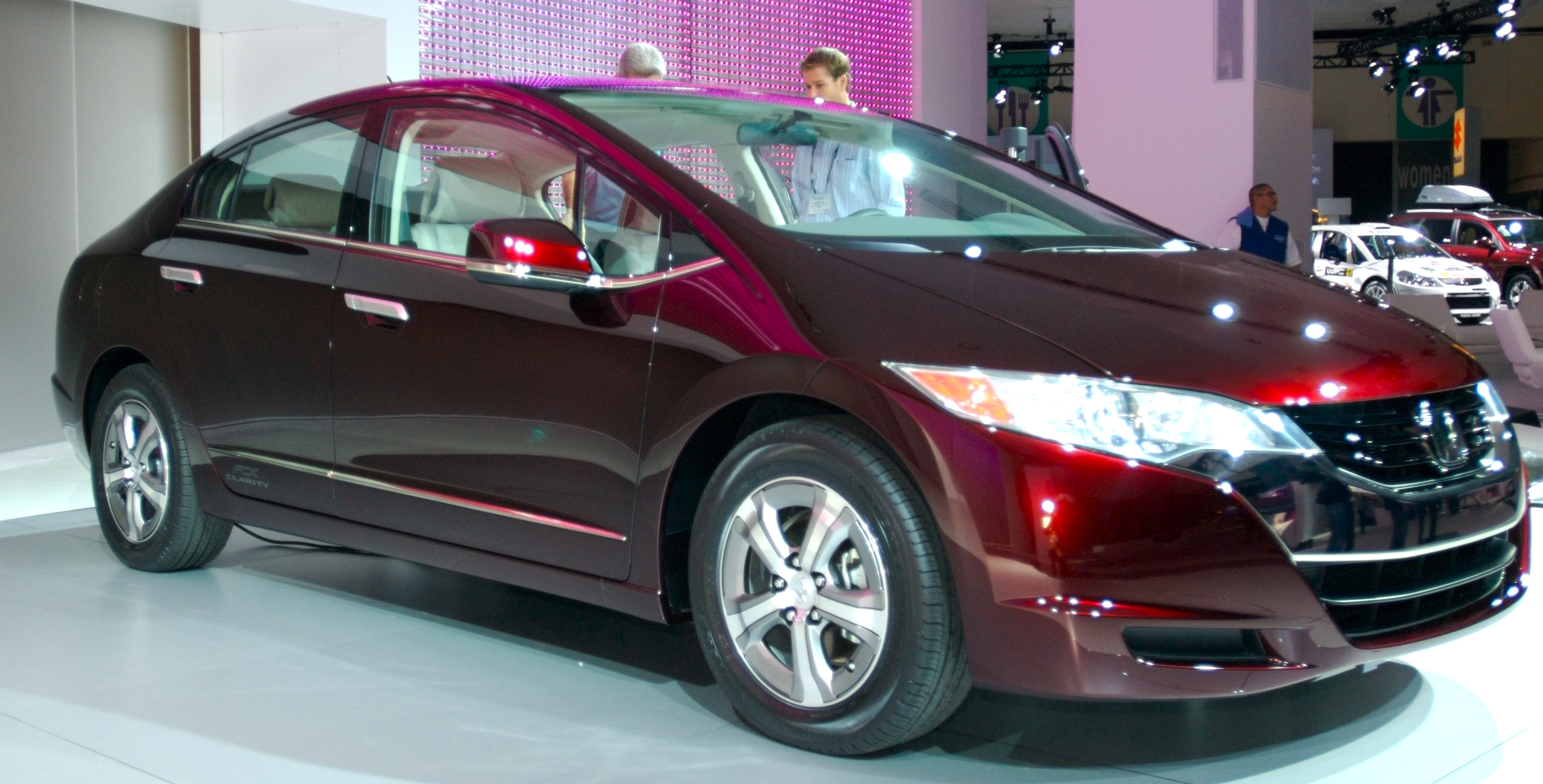
2008 Honda FCX Clarity

Honda established the world's first fuel cell vehicle dealer network in 2008, and at the time was the only company able to lease hydrogen fuel cell vehicles to private customers. The Honda FCX Clarity was introduced in 2008 for leasing by customers in Japan and Southern California and discontinued by 2015. From 2008 to 2014, Honda leased a total of 45 FCX units in the US. Over 20 other FCEV prototypes and demonstration cars were released in that time period, including the GM HydroGen4, and Mercedes-Benz F-Cell.

The Hyundai ix35 FCEV Fuel Cell vehicle was available for lease from 2014 to 2018, when 54 units were leased. In 2018, Hyundai introduced the Nexo. In 2024, Hyundai recalled all 1600 Nexo vehicles sold in the US to that time due to a risk of fuel leaks and fire from a faulty "pressure relief device".

Sales of the Toyota Mirai to customers began in Japan in December 2014. Pricing started at ¥6,700,000 (~US$57,400) before taxes and a government incentive of ¥2,000,000 (~US$19,600). Former European Parliament President Pat Cox estimated that Toyota initially would lose about $100,000 on each Mirai sold. As of December 2017, global sales totaled 5,300 Mirais. The top selling markets were the U.S. with 2,900 units, Japan with 2,100 and Europe with 200.

In 2015, Toyota announced that it would offer all 5,680 patents related to hydrogen fuel cell vehicles and hydrogen fuel cell charging station technology, which it has been researching for over 20 years, to its competitors free of charge in order to stimulate the market for hydrogen-powered vehicles. The Honda Clarity Fuel Cell was produced from 2016 to 2021. The 2017 Clarity had the highest combined and city fuel economy ratings among all hydrogen fuel cell cars rated by the EPA that year, with a combined city/highway rating of 67 miles per gallon gasoline equivalent (MPGe), and 68 MPGe in city driving. In 2019, Katsushi Inoue, the president of Honda Europe, stated, "Our focus is on hybrid and electric vehicles now. Maybe hydrogen fuel cell cars will come, but that's a technology for the next era."

By 2017, Daimler phased out its FCEV development, citing declining battery costs and increasing range of EVs, and most of the automobile companies developing hydrogen cars had switched their focus to battery electric vehicles. By 2020, only three car makers were still manufacturing, or had active manufacturing programs for hydrogen cars. In 2023, 3,143 hydrogen cars were sold in the US compared with 380,000 BEVs. The Clarity was later discontinued, but the Honda CR-V e:FCEV became available, for lease only, in very limited quantities in 2024. In 2024 (through November), Toyota's worldwide sales fell to 1,702 hydrogen fuel cell vehicles.

A significant number of the public hydrogen fuel stations in California are not able to dispense hydrogen. In 2024, Mirai owners filed a class action lawsuit in California over the lack of availability of hydrogen for fuel cell electric cars, alleging, among other things, fraudulent concealment and misrepresentation as well as violations of California’s false advertising law and breaches of implied warranty.

==== Fuel economy ====
The following table compares EPA's fuel economy expressed in miles per gallon gasoline equivalent (MPGe) for the two models of hydrogen fuel cell vehicles rated by the EPA as of September 2021, and available in California.

Comparison of fuel economy expressed in MPGe for hydrogen fuel cell vehicles available for sale or lease in California and rated by the U.S. Environmental Protection Agency as of September 2021
Vehicle	Model year	Combined fuel economy	City fuel economy	Highway fuel economy	Range	Annual fuel cost
Hyundai Nexo	2019–2021	61 mpg-e	65 mpg-e	58 mpg-e	380 mi (610 km)	
Toyota Mirai	2016–2020	66 mpg-e	66 mpg-e	66 mpg-e	312 mi (502 km)	
Toyota Mirai	2021	74 mpg-e	76 mpg-e	71 mpg-e	402 mi (647 km)	
Notes: One kg of hydrogen has roughly the same energy content as one U.S. gallon of gasoline.

=== Fuel cells powered by an ethanol reformer ===
In June 2016, Nissan announced plans to develop fuel cell vehicles powered by ethanol rather than hydrogen. Nissan claims this technical approach would be cheaper, and that it would be easier to deploy the fueling infrastructure than a hydrogen infrastructure. The vehicle would include a tank holding a blend of water and ethanol, which is fed into an onboard reformer that splits it into hydrogen and carbon dioxide. The hydrogen is then fed into a solid oxide fuel cell. According to Nissan, the liquid fuel could be an ethanol-water blend at a 55:45 ratio.

=== Buses ===
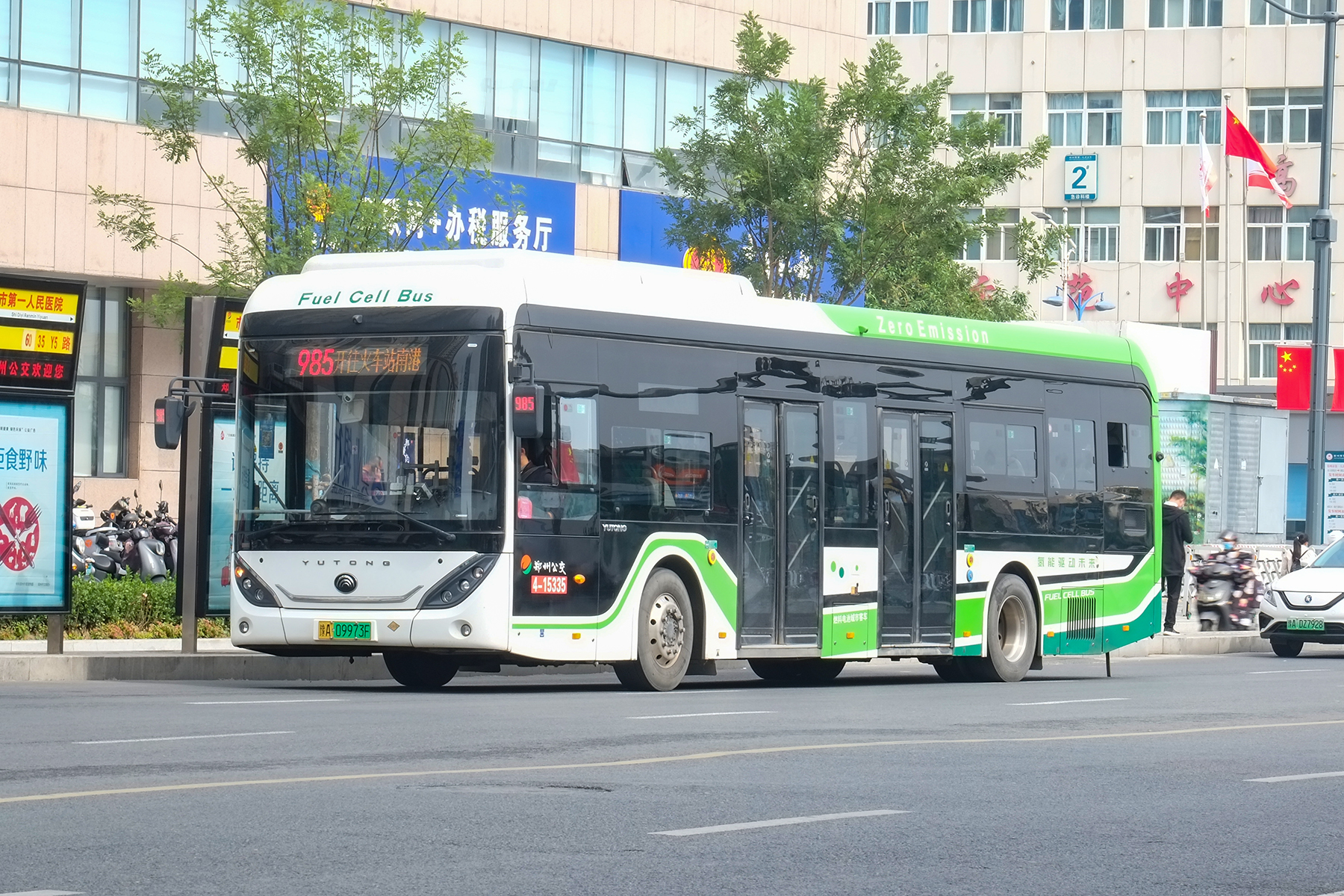
Yutong F12 in Zhengzhou, China in 2022

As of 2020, 5,648 hydrogen fuel cell buses were in use around the world, with 93.7% of them in China.

From the late 1980s, concern regarding diesel emissions from buses led to experimentation with fuel cells to power them. After initial experiments with phosphoric acid fuel cells, hydrogen-powered fuel-cell buses were tested in cities in the late 1990s. In the 2000s, buses entered trial service in cities around the world; the European Union supported the research project Clean Urban Transport for Europe.

By the 2010s, commercial introduction of hydrogen fuel cell buses was underway around the world. However, many transit operators were purchasing battery electric buses instead, as these were cheaper to operate and purchase. However, battery electric buses lacked range compared to diesel buses, take time to charge (often overnight, compared with hydrogen fuel cell buses, which can be refilled quickly) and have reduced range in cold weather. Some companies proposed using the fuel cell as a range extender, combining it with a larger battery or a supercapacitor.

Hydrogen fuel cell buses have historically been significantly more expensive to purchase and operate than diesel, hybrid or electric buses. In recent years, purchase costs have been reduced to levels comparable with diesel buses, though operating costs remain much higher.

A variety of bus manufacturers are currently producing hydrogen fuel cell buses, but by 2025, most hydrogen bus programs in Europe had been cancelled or fuel cell bus purchases discontinued. Bus manufacturers sometimes work with a provider of hydrogen fuel cells to power the buses, such as Ballard Power Systems or Toyota.

=== Forklifts ===
A fuel cell forklift (also called a fuel cell lift truck or a fuel cell forklift) is a fuel cell-powered industrial forklift truck used to lift and transport materials. Most fuel cells used in forklifts are powered by PEM fuel cells.

In 2013, there were over 4,000 fuel cell forklifts used in material handling in the US of which 500 received funding from DOE (2012). As of 2024, approximately 50,000 hydrogen forklifts are in operation worldwide (the bulk of which are in the U.S.), as compared with 1.2 million battery electric forklifts that were purchased in 2021.

PEM fuel-cell-powered forklifts provide significant benefits over petroleum powered forklifts as they produce no local emissions. Fuel-cell forklifts can work for a full 8-hour shift on a single tank of hydrogen, can be refueled in 3 minutes and have a lifetime of 8–10 years. Fuel cell-powered forklifts are often used in refrigerated warehouses as their performance is not degraded by lower temperatures. In design the FC units are often made as drop-in replacements.

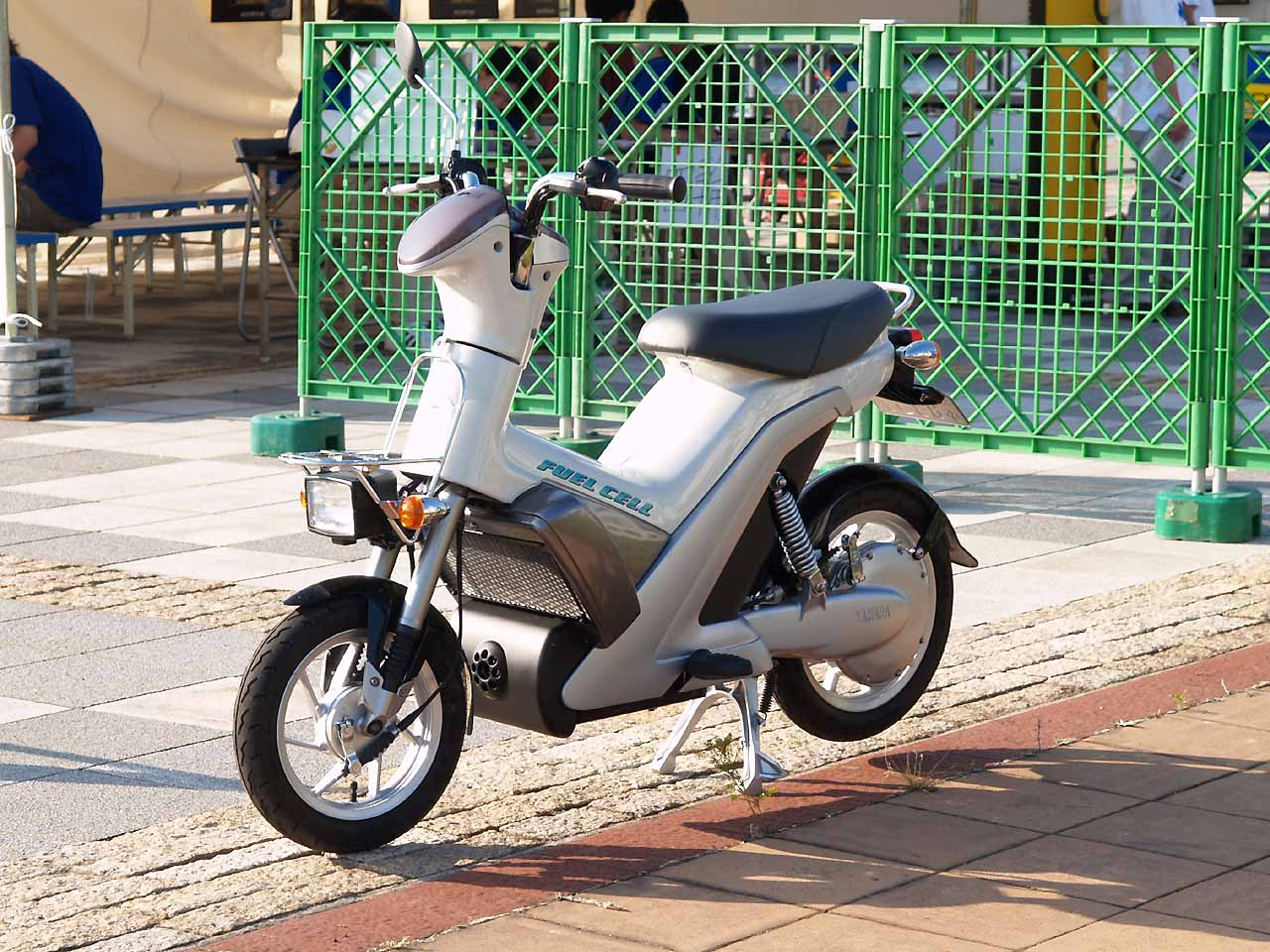
Yamaha FC-me motorcycle

=== Motorcycles and bicycles ===
In 2005, the British firm Intelligent Energy produced the first working hydrogen run motorcycle called the ENV (Emission Neutral Vehicle). It holds enough fuel to run for four hours, and to travel 160 km (100 miles) in an urban area, at a top speed of 80 km/h (50 mph). There are other examples of bikes and bicycles with a hydrogen fuel cell engine. The Suzuki Burgman received "whole vehicle type" approval in the EU. The PHB was a hydrogen bicycle with an electric motor. It debuted in Shanghai in 2008, but it was discontinued due to lack of hydrogen fuel services. Its predecessor was a hydrogen bicycle called Palcan, based in Vancouver, Canada.

=== Airplanes ===
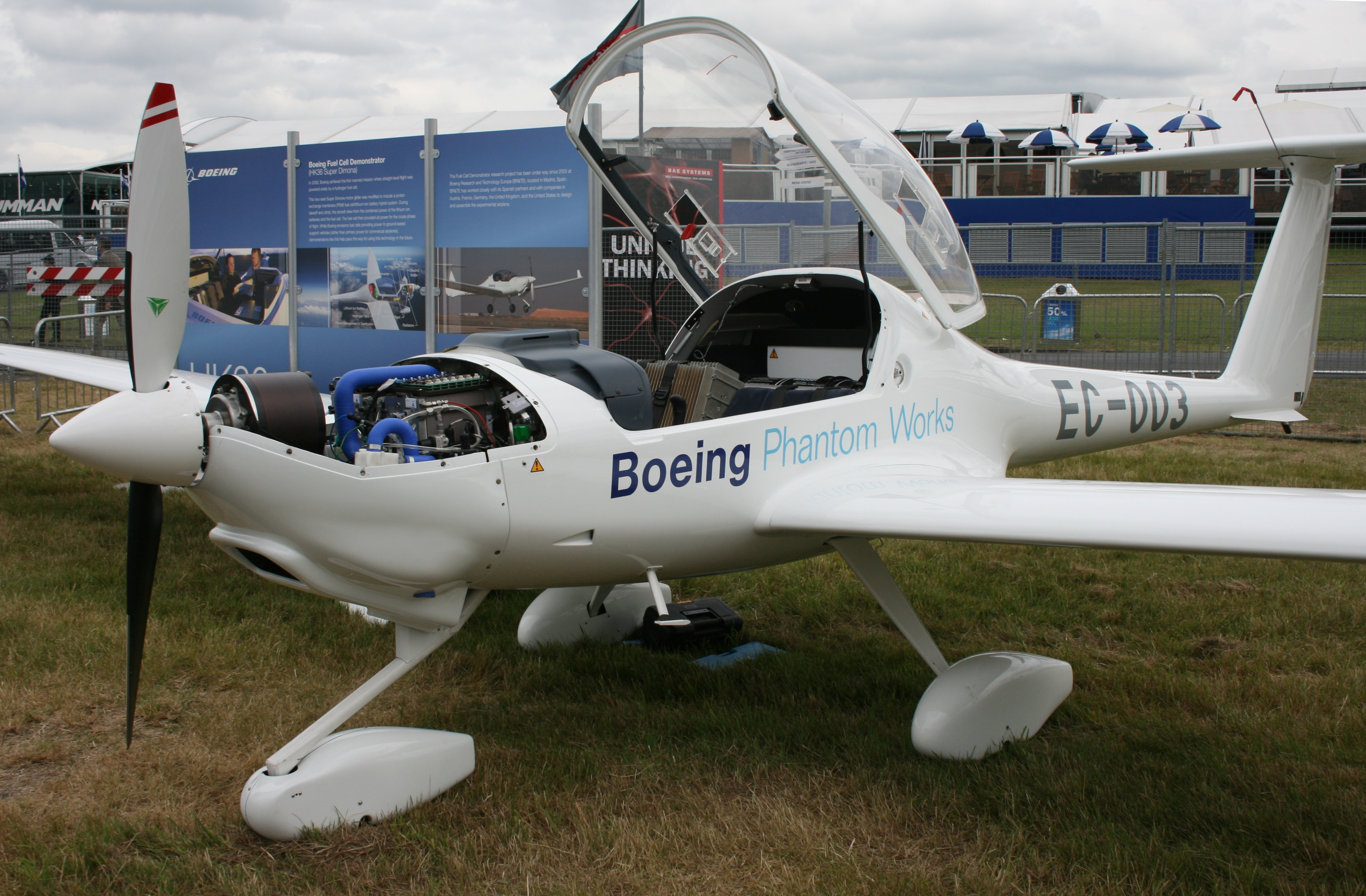
The Boeing Fuel Cell Demonstrator powered by a hydrogen fuel cell

Boeing researchers and industry partners throughout Europe conducted experimental flight tests in February 2008 of a crewed airplane powered only by a fuel cell and lightweight batteries. The Fuel Cell Demonstrator Airplane, as it was called, used a Proton-Exchange Membrane (PEM) fuel cell/lithium-ion battery hybrid system to power an electric motor, which was coupled to a conventional propeller. In 2003, the world's first propeller driven airplane to be powered entirely by a fuel cell was flown. The fuel cell was a unique FlatStack stack design which allowed the fuel cell to be integrated with the aerodynamic surfaces of the plane.

There have been several fuel cell powered unmanned aerial vehicles (UAV). A Horizon fuel cell UAV set the record distance flown by a small UAV in 2007. The military is especially interested in this application because of the low noise, low thermal signature and ability to attain high altitude. In 2009, the Naval Research Laboratory's (NRL's) Ion Tiger utilized a hydrogen-powered fuel cell and flew for 23 hours and 17 minutes. Boeing is completing tests on the Phantom Eye, a high-altitude, long endurance (HALE) to be used to conduct research and surveillance flying at 20,000 m (65,000 ft) for up to four days at a time. Fuel cells are also being used to provide auxiliary power for aircraft, replacing fossil fuel generators that were previously used to start the engines and power on board electrical needs. Fuel cells can help airplanes reduce CO_{2} and other pollutant emissions and noise.

=== Boats ===
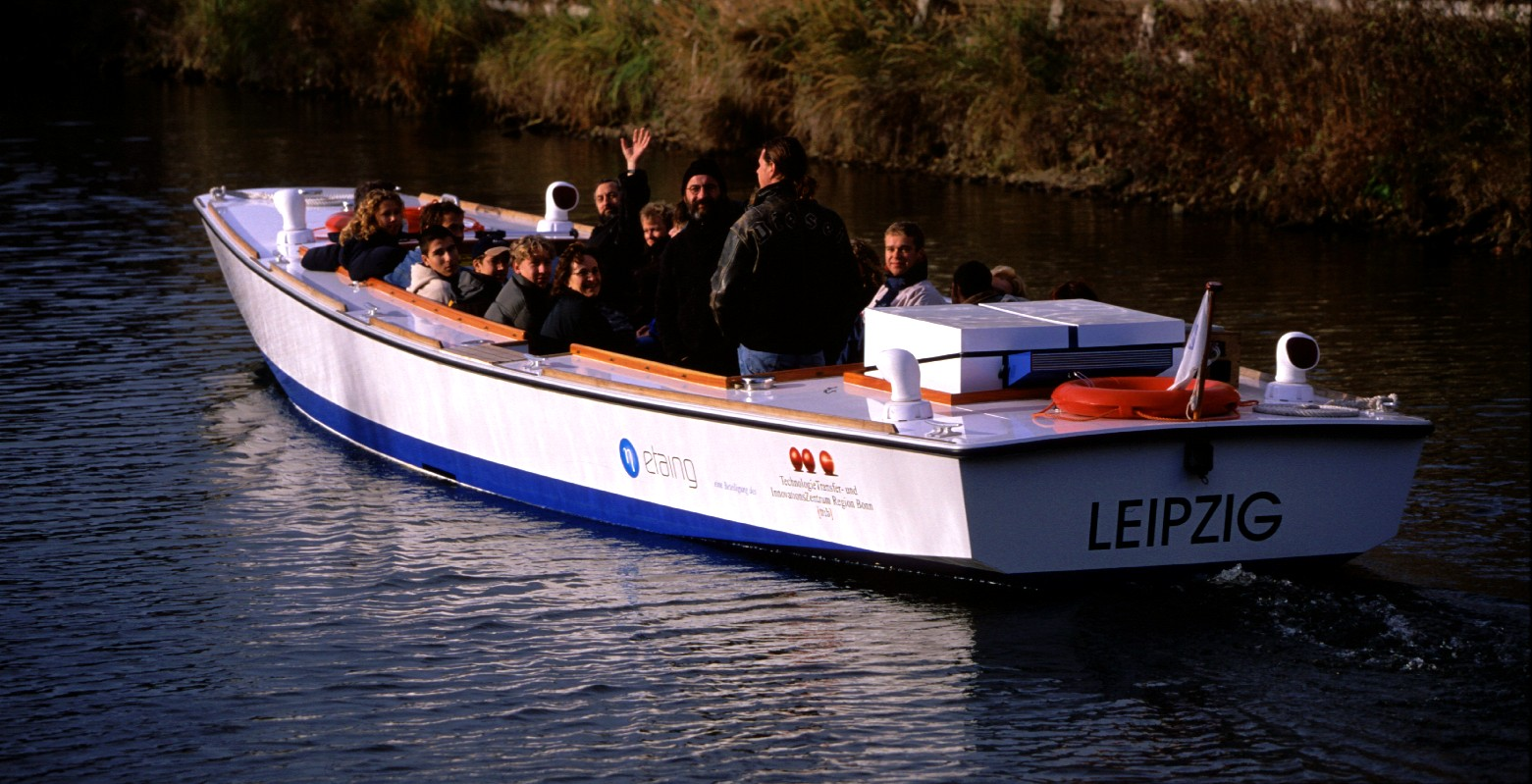
The Hydra fuel cell boat

The world's first Fuel Cell Boat HYDRA used an AFC system with 6.5 kW net output. For each liter of fuel consumed, the average outboard motor produces 140 times less the hydrocarbons produced by the average modern car. Fuel cell engines have higher energy efficiencies than combustion engines, and therefore offer better range and significantly reduced emissions. Amsterdam introduced its first fuel cell powered boat in 2011 that ferries people around the city's canals.

=== Submarines ===
The first submersible application of fuel cells is the German Type 212 submarine. Each Type 212 contains nine PEM fuel cells, spread throughout the ship, providing between 30 kW and 50 kW each of electrical power. This allows the Type 212 to remain submerged longer and makes them more difficult to detect. Fuel cell powered submarines are also easier to design, manufacture, and maintain than nuclear-powered submarines.

=== Trains ===
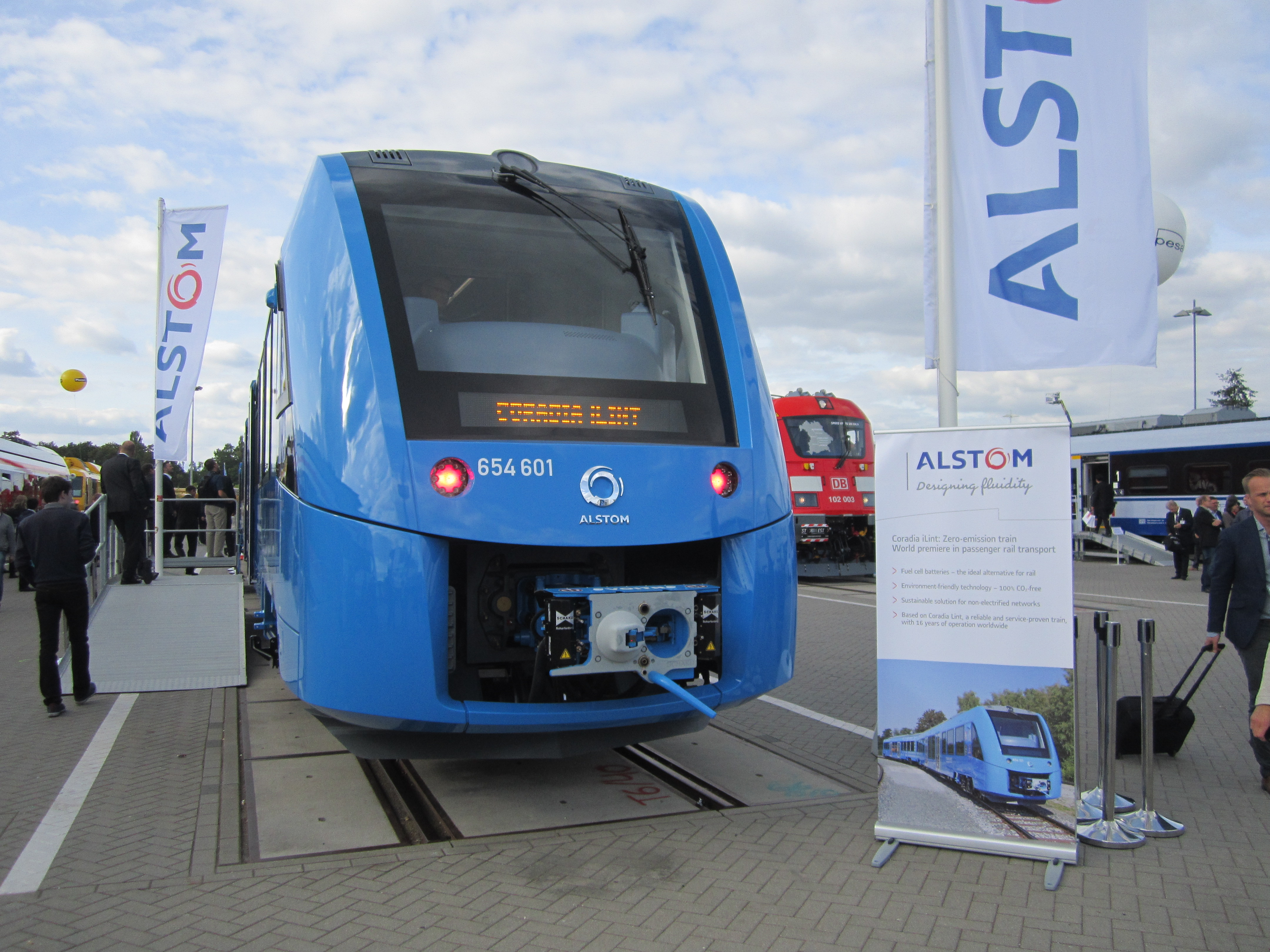
Debut of the Alstom Coradia iLint at InnoTrans 2016

In March 2015, China South Rail Corporation (CSR) demonstrated the world's first hydrogen fuel cell-powered tramcar at an assembly facility in Qingdao. 83 miles of tracks for the new vehicle were built in seven Chinese cities. China had plans to spend 200 billion yuan ($32 billion) over the next five years to increase tram tracks to more than 1,200 miles.

In 2016, Alstom debuted the Coradia iLint, a regional train powered by hydrogen fuel cells. It was designed to reach 140 kilometres per hour (87 mph) and travel 600–800 kilometres (370–500 mi) on a full tank of hydrogen. The train entered service in Germany in 2018 and is expected to be tested in the Netherlands beginning in 2019.

Swiss manufacturer Stadler Rail signed a contract in California to deliver a hydrogen fuel cell train in the US, the FLIRT H2 train, in 2024 as part of the Arrow commuter rail service.

=== Trucks ===
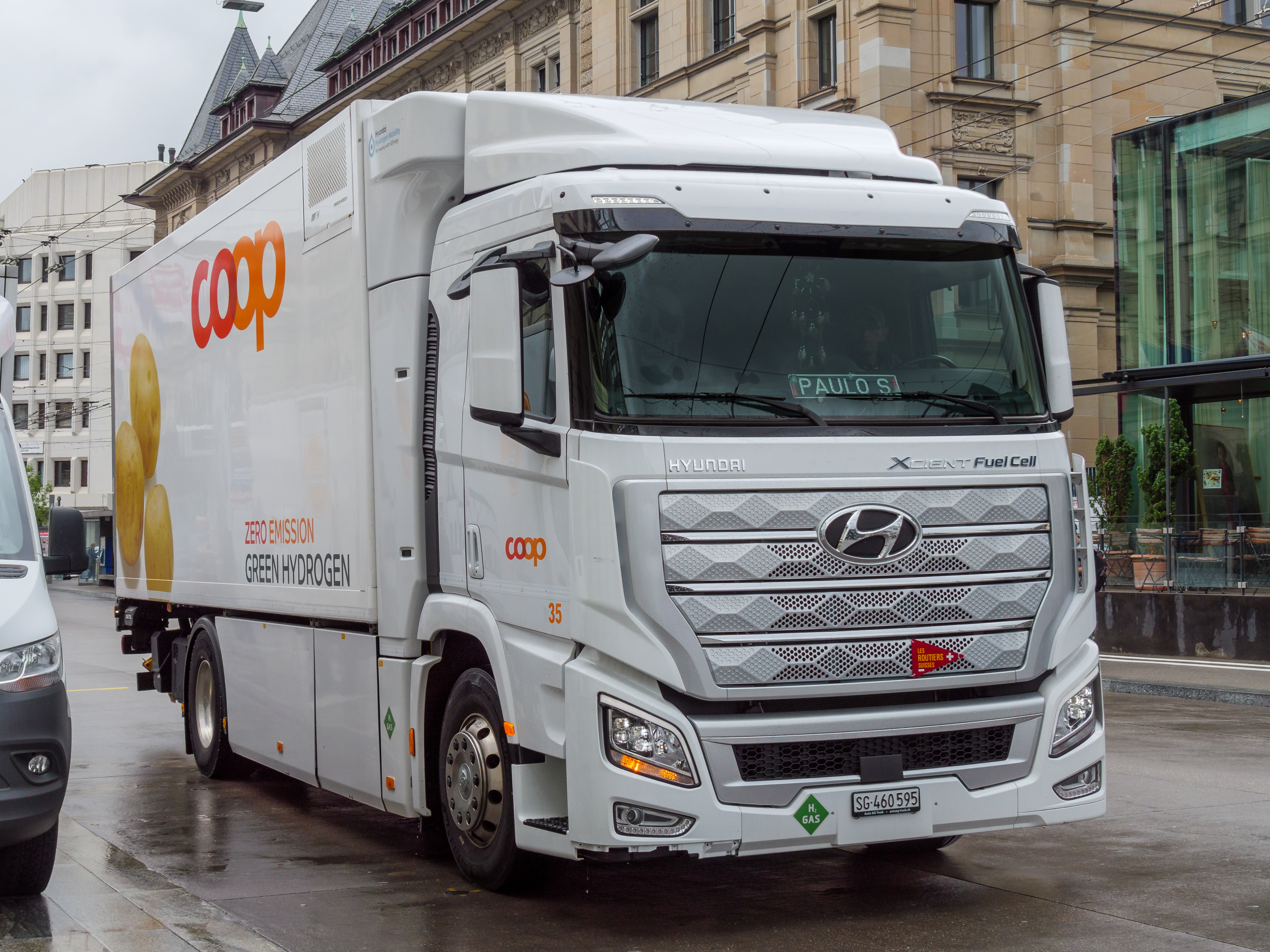
Hyundai Xcient Fuel Cell in Winterthur, Switzerland

For transport applications such as long-haul trucks, fuel cells are a potential solution for zero emission transport. A 2022 study in Energies magazine cites relatively fast refueling times compared with electric truck charging times and the current limitations of the energy density of batteries, but they note that "operating constraints" include the "high amount of CO_{2} emissions [caused by] hydrogen production", the lack of storage and refueling infrastructure, H2 leakage and safety challenges, efficiency "losses in compression, storage and dispensing", .

In 2020, Hyundai started to manufacture hydrogen powered 34-ton cargo trucks under the model name XCIENT, making an initial shipment of 10 of the vehicles to Switzerland. They are able to travel 400 kilometres (250 mi) on a full tank and take 8 to 20 minutes to fill up. In 2022, Total Transportation Services (TTSI), Toyota Logistics Services (TLS), UPS, and Southern Counties Express (SCE) operated a 12-month "Shore-to-Store (S2S) project" running hydrogen fuel cell trucks on trips from Los Angeles area ports. The Kenworth T680 hydrogen prototype used in Los Angeles and Long Beach was unveiled in 2018 and also tested in the Seattle area.

== Hydrogen infrastructure ==
Eberle and Rittmar von Helmolt stated in 2010 that challenges remain before fuel cell cars can become competitive with other technologies and cite the lack of an extensive hydrogen infrastructure in the U.S.: as of July 2020, there were 43 publicly accessible hydrogen refueling stations in the US, 41 of which were located in California. In 2013, Governor Jerry Brown signed AB 8, a bill to fund $20 million a year for 10 years to build up to 100 stations. In 2014, the California Energy Commission funded $46.6 million to build 28 stations.

Japan got its first commercial hydrogen fueling station in 2014. By March 2016, Japan had 80 hydrogen fueling stations, and the Japanese government aims to double this number to 160 by 2020. In May 2017, there were 91 hydrogen fueling stations in Japan. Germany had 18 public hydrogen fueling stations in July 2015. The German government hoped to increase this number to 50 by end of 2016, but only 30 were open in June 2017.

== Codes and standards ==
The regulatory framework for fuel cell vehicles encompasses a comprehensive set of international, national, and organizational standards designed to ensure safety, performance, and environmental protection. These standards address multiple aspects of hydrogen fuel systems, from storage containers to electrical safety systems.

=== International regulatory framework ===
==== UN Global Technical Regulation No. 13 (GTR 13) ====
The foundation of international fuel cell vehicle regulation is UN Global Technical Regulation No. 13 (GTR 13), established on June 27, 2013, under the sponsorship of Germany, Japan, and the United States. GTR 13 applies to all hydrogen-fuelled vehicles of Categories 1-1 and 1-2, with a gross vehicle mass (GVM) of 4,536kg or less. The regulation was developed by the United Nations World Forum for Harmonization of Vehicle Regulations (UN/WP29) with the main purpose of ensuring that hydrogen fuel cell vehicles can achieve the same level of safety as traditional fuel vehicles.

GTR 13 consists of three main sections: high voltage system, hydrogen storage system and hydrogen fuel system at vehicle level. The regulation provides provisions for both in-use and post-crash scenarios. Phase 2 was adopted at the 190th Session of WP.29 on June 21, 2023, broadening the scope to include heavy-duty vehicles.

==== ISO standards ====
ISO 19881 (Gaseous Hydrogen — Land Vehicle Fuel Containers): This standard contains requirements for the material, design, manufacture, marking and testing of serially produced, refillable containers intended only for the storage of compressed hydrogen gas for land vehicle operation. The 2025 edition is harmonised with UN GTR 13 Phase 2, especially regarding fire test protocols, to support mutual recognition of safety standards.

ISO 23273:2013: This international standard addresses fuel cell road vehicles safety specifications and protection against hydrogen hazards for vehicles fuelled with compressed hydrogen.

=== National standards and implementation ===
==== United States ====
NHTSA has proposed two new Federal Motor Vehicle Safety Standards (FMVSSs) to address safety concerns relating to storage and use of hydrogen in motor vehicles: FMVSS No. 308 "Compressed Hydrogen Storage System Integrity" and FMVSS No. 307 "Fuel System Integrity of Hydrogen Vehicles". These proposed standards align with GTR No. 13 requirements.

==== SAE International standards ====
The Society of Automotive Engineers has developed several critical standards for fuel cell vehicles:

- SAE J2578: Recommended Practice for General Fuel Cell Vehicle Safety that identifies and defines requirements relating to the safe integration of the fuel cell system, the hydrogen fuel storage and handling systems and high voltage electrical systems into the overall Fuel Cell Vehicle.
- SAE J2579: Standard for Fuel Systems in Fuel Cell and Other Hydrogen Vehicles that defines design, construction, operational, and maintenance requirements for hydrogen fuel storage and handling systems in on-road vehicles. The test for performance durability is closely consistent with this industry standard.
- SAE J2601 Series: Standards that establish process limits for ambient temperature hydrogen fueling of light-duty automotive vehicles, passenger cars, and trucks that use compressed hydrogen storage systems meeting SAE J2579 requirements.

==== IEC standards for fuel cell technologies ====
The International Electrotechnical Commission has established the IEC 62282 series covering various aspects of fuel cell safety:

- IEC 62282-2-100: Provides safety related requirements for construction, operation under normal and abnormal conditions and the testing of fuel cell modules, dealing with conditions that can yield hazards to persons and cause damage outside the fuel cell modules.
- IEC 62282-4-101: Deals with safety of fuel cell power systems for propulsion other than road vehicles and auxiliary power units (APU), specifically covering safety requirements for fuel cell power systems intended to be used in electrically powered industrial trucks.

=== Technical requirements and service life ===
==== Compressed hydrogen storage systems ====
Under GTR13, compressed hydrogen storage systems must have a service life of 15 years or less. The system includes hydrogen storage container, thermally-activated pressure relief device (TPRD), check valve, shut-off valve, and piping and fittings between components. Hydrogen has typically been stored at a nominal working pressure (NWP) of 35 MPa or 70 MPa, with maximum fuelling pressures of 125 percent of NWP (43.8 MPa or 87.5 MPa respectively).

For performance durability testing, three containers must be hydraulically pressurized for 22,000 cycles to 125 percent NWP without breakage. Considering a service life of 15 years, leakage must be prevented within 11,000 cycles.

==== Safety requirements ====
Key safety requirements include controlling hydrogen leakage rates, with the hydrogen leakage rate of the venting system during crash testing required to be less than 118NL/h. Hydrogen concentration in the passenger compartment and luggage compartment must be kept below 4% by volume fraction.

Warning systems must activate when hydrogen concentrations in air of 2 percent ± 1.0 percent or greater by volume fraction is detected, and the main shutoff valve must be closed when hydrogen concentration exceeds 3 percent ± 1.0 percent by volume in air in enclosed or semi-enclosed spaces.

=== Global harmonization and development ===
Regulations, codes and standards are conducive to overcoming technological barriers to commercialization. During the last decade, there has been focused effort in the international hydrogen community including the European Union, the United States, Canada, Japan, China, and international organizations to develop comprehensive standards for composite tanks for on-board gaseous hydrogen storage.

The implementation of GTR13 has greatly influenced the development of fuel cell vehicles and compressed hydrogen storage systems globally, requiring alignment of national standards with international requirements to eliminate trade barriers in the fuel cell vehicle industry.

== United States policy and funding ==
=== Early federal initiatives (2003-2013) ===
In 2003, US President George Bush proposed the Hydrogen Fuel Initiative (HFI). The HFI aimed to further develop hydrogen fuel cells and infrastructure technologies to accelerate the commercial introduction of fuel cell vehicles. By 2008, the U.S. had contributed 1 billion dollars to this project. In 2009, Steven Chu, then the US Secretary of Energy, asserted that hydrogen vehicles "will not be practical over the next 10 to 20 years". In 2012, however, Chu stated that he saw fuel cell cars as more economically feasible as natural gas prices had fallen and hydrogen reforming technologies had improved.

=== California leadership and H2USA program (2013) ===
California emerged as a leader in hydrogen infrastructure development in 2013. In June 2013, the California Energy Commission granted $18.7 million for hydrogen fueling stations. That same year, Governor Jerry Brown signed Assembly Bill 8, legislation funding $20 million annually for 10 years to support up to 100 hydrogen refueling stations statewide.

Concurrently, the U.S. Department of Energy announced up to $4 million in fiscal year 2014 funding for the "continued development of advanced hydrogen storage systems" to provide adequate onboard storage for fuel cell electric vehicles and emerging applications such as material handling equipment. On May 13, 2013, the Energy Department launched H2USA, a public-private partnership focused on advancing hydrogen infrastructure deployment across the United States.

=== Infrastructure Investment and Jobs Act (2021) ===
On November 15, 2021, President Biden signed into law the $1.2 trillion Infrastructure Investment and Jobs Act (also known as the Bipartisan Infrastructure Law), which includes $9.5 billion in hydrogen-specific provisions to drive large-scale deployment and investment in the hydrogen industry. The legislation authorizes $8 billion for large-scale regional clean hydrogen hubs, $1 billion for clean hydrogen electrolysis research and development, and $500 million for clean hydrogen manufacturing and recycling.

The Regional Clean Hydrogen Hubs program requires diversity in feedstock, end-use, and geography, with at least one hub producing hydrogen from fossil fuels, one from renewable energy, and one from nuclear energy. Under end-use diversity requirements, hubs must demonstrate hydrogen use in power generation, industrial sector, residential and commercial heating, and transportation.

In October 2023, the Biden administration announced $7 billion in funding for seven Regional Clean Hydrogen Hubs across the United States. The H2Hubs are expected to collectively produce three million metric tons of hydrogen annually, reaching nearly a third of the 2030 U.S. production target and reducing 25 million metric tons of carbon dioxide (CO_{2}) emissions from end-uses each year.

=== Inflation Reduction Act (2022) ===
The Inflation Reduction Act established significant hydrogen incentives, including a new Clean Hydrogen Production Tax Credit providing up to $3.00 per kilogram of hydrogen for qualifying clean hydrogen production facilities. The credit amount is based on carbon intensity, with the highest incentive for hydrogen produced with nearly zero emissions. Projects can alternatively elect to claim up to a 30% investment tax credit under Section 48.

The Act also extends the 30% fuel cell investment tax credit through 2024 and includes a new 30% investment tax credit for energy storage, including hydrogen storage. Additionally, it increased the Alternative Fuel Refueling Property Credit cap from $30,000 to $100,000 and includes credits for fuel cell vehicles, including commercial vehicles.

On January 3, 2025, the U.S. Department of the Treasury released final rules for the Clean Hydrogen Production Tax Credit, providing clarity and investment certainty for hydrogen producers using various sources including electricity, natural gas with carbon capture, and renewable natural gas.

=== Additional federal support ===
The Charging and Fueling Infrastructure Grant Program, established under the Infrastructure Investment and Jobs Act, provided competitive grants in 2024 for hydrogen fueling infrastructure deployment along designated Alternative Fuel Corridors. The program included $1.32 billion in estimated total funding, with at least 50 percent directed to community grants prioritizing rural areas and low- and moderate-income neighborhoods.

The U.S. Department of Energy's Hydrogen and Fuel Cell Technologies Office provides grants of up to $10 million for research, development, demonstration, and deployment of affordable clean-hydrogen technologies, and up to $500 million through the Domestic Manufacturing Conversion Grants Program for domestic production of hydrogen fuel cell electric vehicles and components.

== Cost ==
By 2010, advancements in fuel cell technology had reduced the size, weight and cost of fuel cell electric vehicles. In 2010, the U.S. Department of Energy (DOE) estimated that the cost of automobile fuel cells had fallen 80% since 2002 and that such fuel cells could potentially be manufactured for $51/kW, assuming high-volume manufacturing cost savings. Fuel cell electric vehicles have been produced with "a driving range of more than 250 miles between refueling". They can be refueled in less than 5 minutes. Deployed fuel cell buses have a 40% higher fuel economy than diesel buses. EERE's Fuel Cell Technologies Program claims that, as of 2011, fuel cells achieved a 42 to 53% fuel cell electric vehicle efficiency at full power, and a durability of over 75,000 miles with less than 10% voltage degradation, double that achieved in 2006. In 2012, Lux Research, Inc. issued a report that concluded that "Capital cost ... will limit adoption to a mere 5.9 GW" by 2030, providing "a nearly insurmountable barrier to adoption, except in niche applications". Lux's analysis concluded that by 2030, PEM stationary fuel cell applications will reach $1 billion, while the vehicle market, including fuel cell forklifts, will reach a total of $2 billion.

As of September 2023, hydrogen cost $36 per kilogram at public charging stations in California, 14 times as much per mile for a Mirai as compared with a Tesla Model 3. The average price in Germany in 2023 is 12.5 euro per kg.

== Environmental impact ==
The environmental impact of fuel cell vehicles depends on the primary energy with which the hydrogen was produced. Fuel cell vehicles are only environmentally benign when the hydrogen was produced with renewable energy. However, as of 2024, more than 95% hydrogen was still produced using steam methane reformation (about 95% is grey hydrogen, most of the rest is blue hydrogen, and only about 1% is green hydrogen). Moreover, fuel cell vehicles are not as efficient as battery electric vehicles, which consume much less energy per mile. Usually a fuel cell car consumes 2.4 times more energy than a battery electric car; because production and storage of hydrogen is much less efficient than using electricity to directly load a battery. In addition, a 2023 study by the Centre for International Climate and Environmental Research (CICERO) estimated that leaked hydrogen has a global warming effect 11.6 times stronger than CO_{2}.

As of 2009, motor vehicles used most of the petroleum consumed in the U.S. and produced over 60% of the carbon monoxide emissions and about 20% of greenhouse gas emissions in the United States, however production of hydrogen for hydrocracking used in gasoline production, chief amongst its industrial uses, was responsible for approximately 10% of fleet wide greenhouse gas emissions. A vehicle fueled with pure hydrogen emits few pollutants at the tailpipe, producing mainly water and heat, along with trace amounts of NO_{x}, SO_{x}, NO_{2}, SO_{2}, CO, hydrocarbons and particulates; the production of the hydrogen generally creates pollutants, except for the small amount that is made using only renewable energy.

In 2006, Ulf Bossel stated that the large amount of energy required to isolate hydrogen from natural compounds (water, natural gas, biomass), package the light gas by compression or liquefaction, transfer the energy carrier to the user, plus the energy lost when it is converted to useful electricity with fuel cells, leaves around 25% for practical use." Richard Gilbert, co-author of Transport Revolutions: Moving People and Freight without Oil (2010), comments similarly, that producing hydrogen gas ends up using some of the energy it creates. Then, energy is taken up by converting the hydrogen back into electricity within fuel cells. "'This means that only a quarter of the initially available energy reaches the electric motor' ... Such losses in conversion don't stack up well against, for instance, recharging an electric vehicle (EV) like the Nissan Leaf or Chevy Volt from a wall socket". A 2010 well-to-wheels analysis of hydrogen fuel cell vehicles report from Argonne National Laboratory states that renewable H2 pathways offer much larger green house gas benefits. This result has recently been confirmed. In 2010, a US DOE well-to-wheels publication assumed that the efficiency of the single step of compressing hydrogen to 6,250 psi (43.1 MPa) at the refueling station is 94%. A 2016 study in the November issue of the journal Energy by scientists at Stanford University and the Technical University of Munich concluded that, even assuming local hydrogen production, "investing in all-electric battery vehicles is a more economical choice for reducing carbon dioxide emissions, primarily due to their lower cost and significantly higher energy efficiency."

== Criticism of fuel cell cars ==
In 2008, professor Jeremy P. Meyers, in the Electrochemical Society journal Interface wrote that fuel cells "are not as efficient as batteries, due primarily to the inefficiency of the oxygen reduction reaction. ... [T]hey make the most sense for operation disconnected from the grid, or when fuel can be provided continuously. For applications that require frequent and relatively rapid start-ups ... where zero emissions are a requirement, as in enclosed spaces such as warehouses." Also in 2008, Wired News reported that "experts say it will be 40 years or more before hydrogen has any meaningful impact on gasoline consumption or global warming, and we can't afford to wait that long. In the meantime, fuel cells are diverting resources from more immediate solutions." In 2008, Robert Zubrin, the author of Energy Victory, said: "Hydrogen is 'just about the worst possible vehicle fuel'". If hydrogen could be produced using renewable energy, "it would surely be easier simply to use this energy to charge the batteries of all-electric or plug-in hybrid vehicles." The Los Angeles Times wrote in 2009, "Any way you look at it, hydrogen is a lousy way to move cars." The Washington Post asked in November 2009, "[W]hy would you want to store energy in the form of hydrogen and then use that hydrogen to produce electricity for a motor, when electrical energy is already waiting to be sucked out of sockets all over America and stored in auto batteries...?"

The Motley Fool stated in 2013 that "there are still cost-prohibitive obstacles [for hydrogen cars] relating to transportation, storage, and, most importantly, production." Volkswagen's Rudolf Krebs said in 2013 that "no matter how excellent you make the cars themselves, the laws of physics hinder their overall efficiency. The most efficient way to convert energy to mobility is electricity." He elaborated: "Hydrogen mobility only makes sense if you use green energy", but ... you need to convert it first into hydrogen "with low efficiencies" where "you lose about 40 percent of the initial energy". You then must compress the hydrogen and store it under high pressure in tanks, which uses more energy. "And then you have to convert the hydrogen back to electricity in a fuel cell with another efficiency loss". Krebs continued: "in the end, from your original 100 percent of electric energy, you end up with 30 to 40 percent."

In 2014, electric automotive and energy futurist Julian Cox wrote that producing hydrogen from methane "is significantly more carbon intensive per unit of energy than coal. Mistaking fossil hydrogen from the hydraulic fracturing of shales for an environmentally sustainable energy pathway threatens to encourage energy policies that will dilute and potentially derail global efforts to head-off climate change due to the risk of diverting investment and focus from vehicle technologies that are economically compatible with renewable energy." In 2014, former Dept. of Energy official Joseph Romm concluded that renewable energy cannot economically be used to make hydrogen for an FCV fleet "either now or in the future." GreenTech Media's analyst reached similar conclusions in 2014. In 2015, Clean Technica listed some of the disadvantages of hydrogen fuel cell vehicles.

A 2017 analysis published in Green Car Reports found that the best hydrogen fuel cell vehicles consume "more than three times more electricity per mile than an electric vehicle ... generate more greenhouse-gas emissions than other powertrain technologies ... [and have] very high fuel costs. ... Considering all the obstacles and requirements for new infrastructure (estimated to cost as much as $400 billion), fuel-cell vehicles seem likely to be a niche technology at best, with little impact on U.S. oil consumption. A 2019 video by Real Engineering noted that using hydrogen as a fuel for cars does not help to reduce carbon emissions from transportation. The 95% of hydrogen still produced from fossil fuels releases carbon dioxide, and producing hydrogen from water is an energy-consuming process. Storing hydrogen requires more energy either to cool it down to the liquid state or to put it into tanks under high pressure, and delivering the hydrogen to fueling stations requires more energy and may release more carbon. The hydrogen needed to move a FCV a kilometer costs approximately eight times as much as the electricity needed to move a BEV the same distance. Also in 2019, Katsushi Inoue, the president of Honda Europe, stated, "Our focus is on hybrid and electric vehicles now. Maybe hydrogen fuel cell cars will come, but that's a technology for the next era."

Assessments since 2020 have concluded that hydrogen vehicles are still only 38% efficient, while battery EVs from 80% to 95% efficient. A 2021 assessment by CleanTechnica concluded that while hydrogen cars are far less efficient than electric cars, the vast majority of hydrogen being produced is polluting grey hydrogen, and delivering hydrogen would require building a vast and expensive new infrastructure, the remaining two "advantages of fuel cell vehicles – longer range and fast fueling times – are rapidly being eroded by improving battery and charging technology." A 2022 study in Nature Electronics agreed.

== Innovation ==
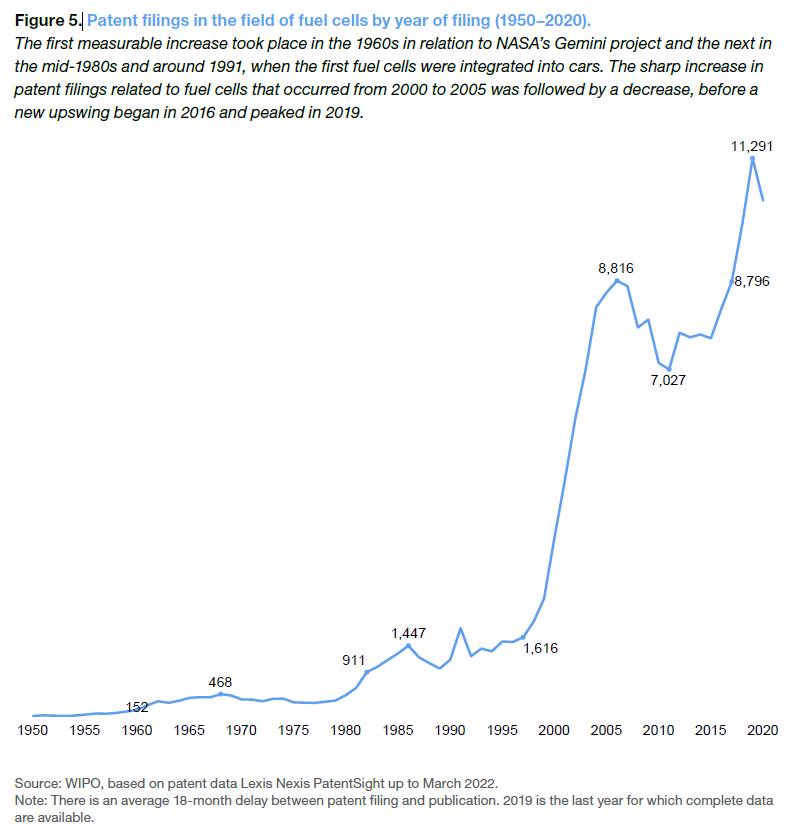
Graph showing increase in fuel cell patent applications

Fuel cell patent fillings in the area of hydrogen fuel cells increased in the 1960s, partly due to NASAs space program; another increase in the 80s was driven by research for automobiles. This was followed by a surge in filings from 2000 to 2005 by inventors in Japan, US and South Korea. Since then, China has dominated patent fillings in the field, with a smaller number in Japan, Germany, South Korea and the US. Between 2016 and 2020, annual filings, particularly for transportation applications, increased by a further 23%.

Almost 80% of the patents in the area of fuel cells for transportation were filed by car companies. Academia is collaborating actively with the industry. Although filings related to road vehicles such as cars and trucks dominate, inventions in other areas like shipping, aviation, rail and other special vehicles is increasing. Airbus, a major aircraft manufacturer, has increased its patenting activity in the area since 2019. The number of fuel cell patents for shipping applications is comparable in size to the one for aviation and similarly slow in growth.

A 2022 World Intellectual Property Organization report argues that because heavy-duty vehicles, such as construction vehicles, forklifts, and airport tugs require a higher payload, the high energy density of hydrogen can make fuel cells a more advantageous solution than battery applications.

== See also ==
- Hydrogen vehicle
- Glossary of fuel cell terms
- Proton-exchange membrane fuel cell
- Reformed methanol fuel cell
- Fuel cell auxiliary power unit
- Fuel Cell and Hydrogen Energy Association
- Hydrogen fuel enhancement
- Water-fuelled car
