= Hohm =

Microsoft web application

Microsoft Hohm was an online web application by Microsoft that enabled consumers to analyze their energy usage and provided energy saving recommendations.

== History ==
Announced on June 24, 2009, Microsoft Hohm was built on the Windows Azure cloud operating system. Microsoft licensed the Home Energy Saver energy simulation program developed at Lawrence Berkeley National Laboratory to drive Microsoft Hohm. It was publicly released on July 6, 2009.

Home Energy Saver and Hohm received an R&D 100 Award in 2010.

== Fate of Hohm ==
The Hohm service was discontinued on May 31, 2012, due to a lack of consumer uptake.

== See also ==
- Google PowerMeter
- Home energy monitor
- OPOWER
