= Home Energy Station =

Heat and electricity generator

Home Energy Station is the name of Honda's heat and electricity generator for the home as well as a fuel provider for hydrogen-powered fuel cell vehicles. HES IV is able to supply a sufficient amount of hydrogen to power a fuel cell vehicle, such as the Honda FCX, for daily operation while providing electricity for an average-sized household on an average days usage of energy.

The system reforms natural gas to extract up to 3 normal cubic meters per hour (Nm3/hr) of hydrogen, which is stored in an internal tank. This hydrogen is stored for later use by the vehicle, and can also be supplied to hydrogen appliances or fuel cells within the home. The heat generated by the reforming process can also provide hot water to the home.

In addition to providing as much as 5 kilowatts of electrical power to the home, the Home Energy Station is also able to function as a backup power generation system during power outages.

2005 - The Home Energy Station III underwent testing at Honda R&D Americas Torrance, California.

2007 - The Home Energy Station IV underwent testing for use with the Honda FCX Clarity.

== See also ==
- Horizon Fuel Cell Technologies HydroFILL
- ITM Power Green-box
- Hydrogen station
- Hydrogen economy
- Plug Power
- Gas Generator
