= Honda Clarity =

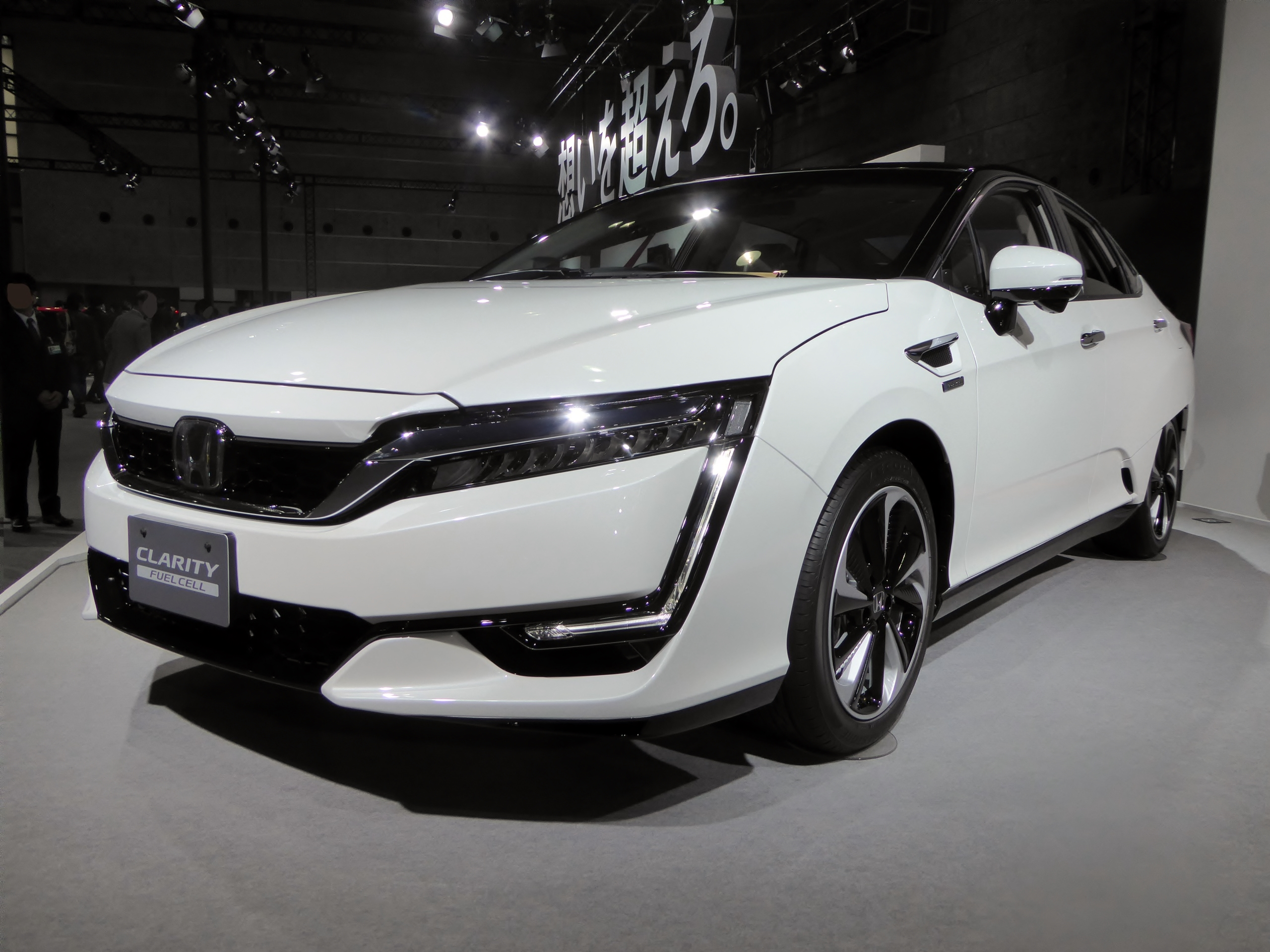
- 2015 Honda Clarity FCV

Overview
- Manufacturer: Honda
- Production: 2008–2014 (Honda FCX Clarity); 2016–2021 (Honda Clarity)

Body and chassis
- Class: Mid-size car
- Body style: 4-door sedan
- Layout: FF layout

Chronology
- Predecessor: Honda FCX

The Honda Clarity is a nameplate used by Honda on alternative fuel vehicles. It was initially used only on hydrogen fuel-cell electric vehicles such as the 2008 Honda FCX Clarity, but in 2017 the nameplate was expanded to include the battery-electric Honda Clarity Electric and the plug-in hybrid electric Honda Clarity Plug-in Hybrid, in addition to the next generation Honda Clarity Fuel Cell. Clarity production ended in August 2021 with US leases for the fuel cell variant continuing through to 2022. As of 2025, the Honda Clarity (2016-2021) is the last known production car to feature fixed rear wheel skirts.

== Honda FCX Clarity (2008–2014) ==
FCX Clarity
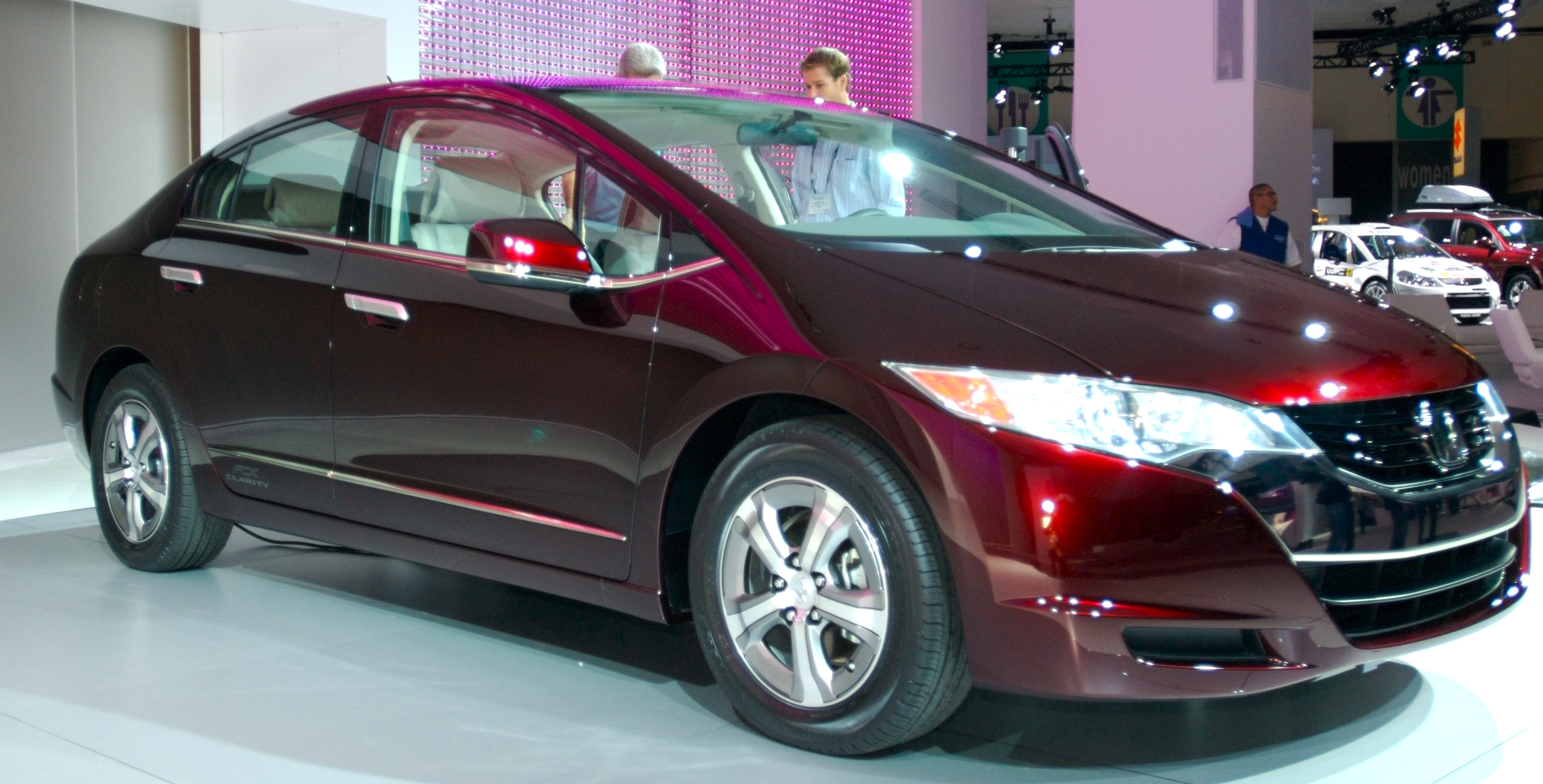

Overview
- Also called: Honda Clarity
- Production: 2008–2014
- Assembly: Takanezawa Plant, Takanezawa, Japan
- Designer: Sachito Fujimoto

Body and chassis
- Related: FCX Concept

Powertrain
- Electric motor: Fuel cell-powered 100 kW (130 hp)
- Transmission: Single Speed, Direct Drive
- Range: 390 km (240 mi) (EPA)

Dimensions
- Wheelbase: 2,800 mm (110.2 in)
- Length: 4,834 mm (190.3 in)
- Width: 1,847 mm (72.7 in)
- Height: 1,468 mm (57.8 in)
- Curb weight: 1,600 kg (3,528 lb)

=== History ===
The Honda FCX Clarity is based on the 2006 Honda FCX Concept and only available as a hydrogen fuel-cell electric vehicle. The FCX Clarity had electric car qualities such as zero emissions while offering five minute refueling times and long range in a full function large sedan. It was the first hydrogen fuel cell vehicle available to retail customers.

Production began in June 2008 with leasing in the U.S. commenced in July 2008. It was introduced in Japan in November 2008. The FCX Clarity was available for lease in the U.S., Japan and Europe. In the U.S., it was only available to customers who live in Southern California where several hydrogen fuel stations are available. FCX Clarity were leased for US$600 a month in 2010, including collision coverage, maintenance, roadside assistance and hydrogen fuel. There were around 10 others on lease in Japan and another 10 in Europe in 2009. One of the reasons for such a low number of cars in the U.S. was a lack of hydrogen filling stations. In 2014 Honda announced to phase out the FCX Clarity. From 2008 to 2015, Honda leased a total of 48 FCX units in the US.

=== Specifications ===
The FCX Clarity electrical power comes from a 100 kW Honda Vertical Flow (V Flow) hydrogen fuel cell stack whereby electricity is supplied on demand. In common with many electric vehicles, the car has regenerative braking and uses a separate battery to store energy recovered during braking.

The electric motor is based on the motor used in the EV Plus, rated at 100 kW (134 hp) and 256 N⋅m (189 lb⋅ft) torque at 0–3056 rpm. The range on a full hydrogen tank of 4.1 kg at 34 MPa (5,000 psi) is EPA certified at 390 km (240 mi). The vehicle is estimated to get about 124 km (77 mi) per kilogram of hydrogen in the city, 108 km (67 mi) per kilogram highway and 116 km (72 mi) per kilogram in combined driving.

=== Design ===
The FCX Clarity is about 100 mm (4 in) shorter than a 2008 Honda Accord. The display in the dashboard includes a dot that changes color and size as hydrogen consumption grows, to make it easier for the driver to monitor their driving efficiency. A separate display shows the battery power level and another shows motor output. A speedometer is placed above the cockpit display to make it easy for the driver to keep eyes on the road. In the interior, upholstery on the seats and door linings are made with Honda's plant-derived Bio-Fabric.

=== Production ===
The FCX Clarity was produced in Japan at a dedicated fuel-cell-vehicle assembly line in the Honda Automobile New Model Center (Takanezawa-machi, Shioya-gun, Tochigi Prefecture). The fuel cell stack itself is produced at Honda Engineering Co., Ltd. (Haga-machi, Haga-gun, Tochigi Prefecture).

It is reported that Honda plans to offer hydrogen fuel cell vehicle at costs competitive with gasoline mid-size cars by 2020 although its 2005 hand-built predecessor to the Clarity cost about $1 million.

In July 2014 Honda announced the FCX Clarity would be discontinued and replaced by a new and higher-volume hydrogen fuel-cell vehicle to be introduced.

=== Running costs ===
It is reported in 2009 that hydrogen made from natural gas cost about $5 to $10 per kilogram in California, and after compression cost and transportation cost, retails for $12 to $14 per kilogram. Although it was more than double the equivalent amount of gasoline during the summer of 2009, fuel-cell cars have double the efficiency of similar models with a gasoline engine. The FCX Clarity averaged 100 km (60 mi) per kilogram of hydrogen.

=== Features ===
The FCX Clarity's features include an AM-FM car radio with CD player, integration for iPod and iPhone, a USB port, auxiliary input, a voice-activated GPS navigation system, XM satellite radio, cloth seating surfaces, Bluetooth, and digital instrumentation.

=== Reception ===
Since the car's unveil at the 2007 Los Angeles Auto Show, it was reported in May 2008 there were 50,000 people inquiring about the car through its Web site.

== Honda Clarity (2016–2021) ==
Clarity Fuel Cell
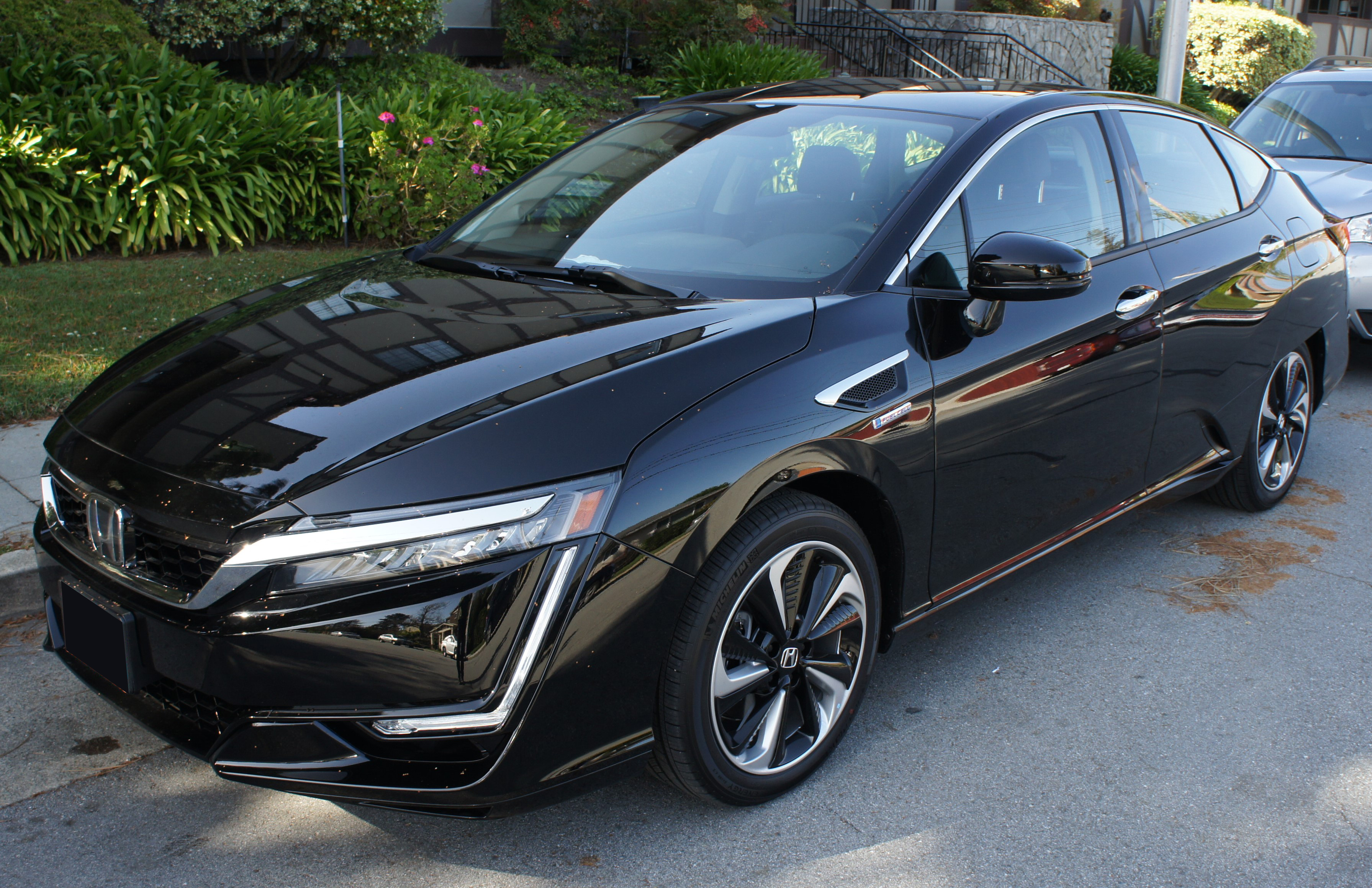

Overview
- Also called: Honda Clarity FCV
- Production: 2016–2021
- Assembly: Takanezawa Plant, Takanezawa, Japan (2017–2018 models); Sayama, Japan (2019–2021 models)

Powertrain
- Electric motor: Fuel cell-powered 103 kW (138 hp)
- Range: 366 mi (589 km) (EPA)

Dimensions
- Wheelbase: 2,750 mm (108.3 in)
- Length: 4,895 mm (192.7 in)
- Width: 1,877 mm (73.9 in)
- Height: 1,478 mm (58.2 in)
- Curb weight: 1,875 kg (4,134 lb)

=== History ===
In November 2014, Honda unveiled the Clarity Fuel Cell concept in Japan. In November 2015, Honda unveiled the Clarity Fuel Cell at the 2015 Los Angeles Auto Show and announced a plug-in hybrid (PHEV) variant. In April 2016, Honda announced that the Clarity Plug-In variant would be released in 2017 and also a Clarity Battery Electric (BEV) variant. Each drive-train variant is distinguished by a unique "hero color" and different front styling, headlights, and taillights.

US sales peaked in 2018, the Clarity's first full year of sales, when just over 20,000 units (all variants) were registered, but dropped steadily and only 2,597 Claritys were delivered in 2021. In June 2021, Honda announced that production of the Clarity Plug-in Hybrid and Clarity Fuel Cell would end in August 2021 with Honda's Sayama plant scheduled to close in March 2022.

=== Fuel Cell ===
Retail deliveries of the 2017 Honda Clarity Fuel Cell began in Southern California in December 2016. The Clarity was available in 12 approved Honda dealerships located in select California markets, including six dealerships in Southern California, five in the San Francisco Bay Area, and one in Sacramento. The Clarity Fuel Cell, with range of 366 mi (589 km), had the highest EPA driving range rating of any zero-emissions vehicle in the U.S., including fuel cell and battery electric vehicles, until the Hyundai Nexo was released in early 2019. The 2017 Clarity also has the highest combined and city fuel economy ratings among all hydrogen fuel cell cars rated by the EPA, with a combined city/highway rating of 67 miles per gallon gasoline equivalent (MPGe), and 68 MPGe in city driving.

=== Fuel economy ratings (fuel cell models) ===
The following table shows fuel economy ratings from the United States Environmental Protection Agency test procedures for both the 2014 FCX Clarity and the 2017 Clarity Fuel Cell, expressed in miles per gallon gasoline equivalent (MPGe). One kg of hydrogen is roughly equivalent to one U.S. gallon of gasoline.

Vehicle	Model year	Combined fuel economy	City fuel economy	Highway fuel economy	Range
Honda FCX Clarity	2014	59 mpg-e	58 mpg-e	60 mpg-e	231 mi (372 km)
Honda Clarity Fuel Cell	2017	67 mpg-e	68 mpg-e	66 mpg-e	366 mi (589 km)

=== Electric ===
Clarity Electric
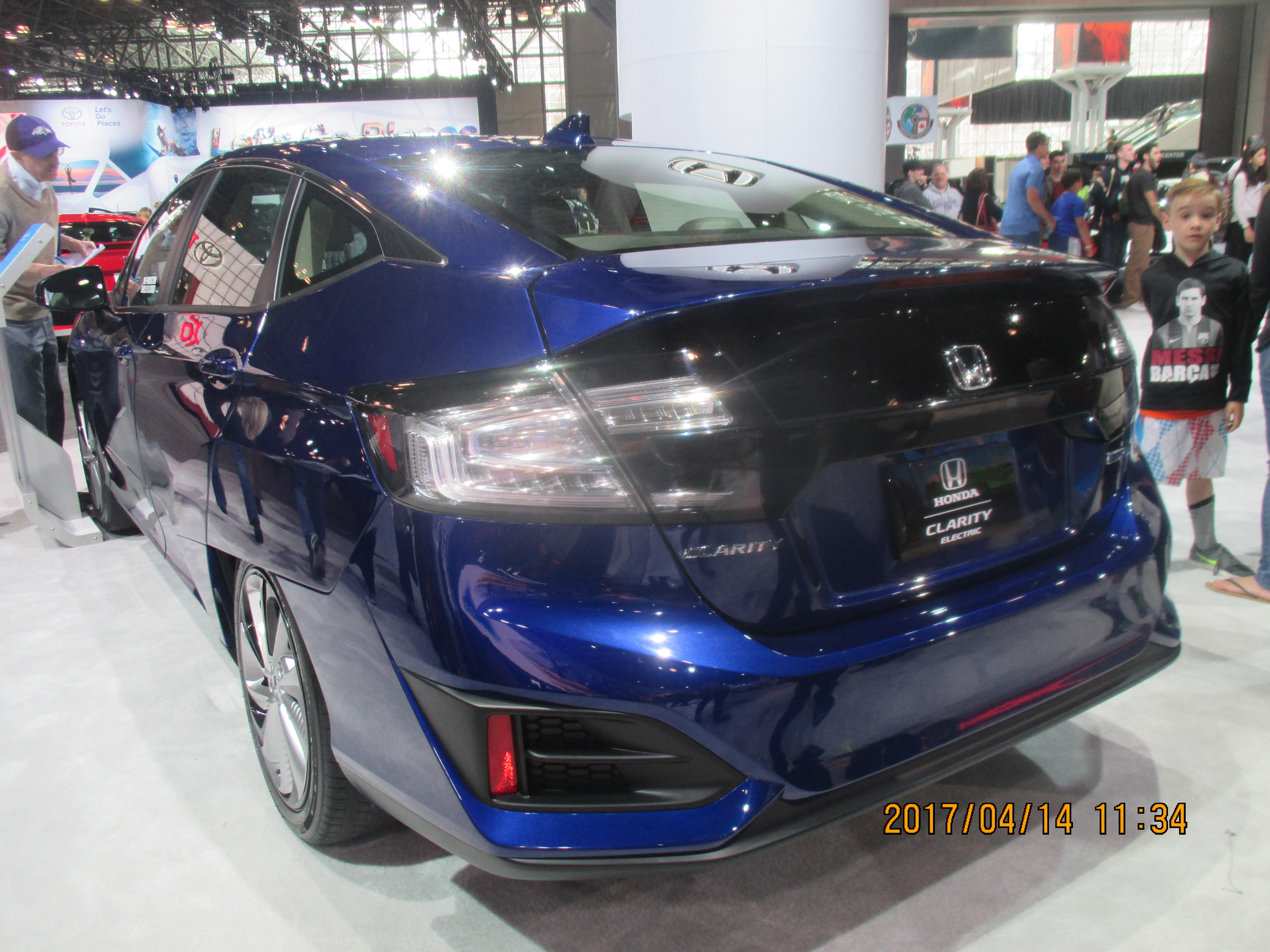

Overview
- Production: 2017–2019
- Model years: 2017–2019
- Assembly: Sayama, Japan

Powertrain
- Electric motor: 120 kW (160 hp)
- Range: 143 km (89 mi)

Dimensions
- Wheelbase: 2,750 mm (108.3 in)
- Length: 4,895 mm (192.7 in)
- Width: 1,877 mm (73.9 in)
- Height: 1,478 mm (58.2 in)
- Curb weight: 1,825 kg (4,024 lb)

In April 2016, Honda announced that in addition to the new generation Clarity Fuel Cell there are two additional variants — the Clarity Electric and Clarity Plug-in Hybrid, which were both released in 2017. The all-electric Clarity EV with a 25.5 kWh battery has 143 km (89 mi) of range, and is only available for a three-year lease (US$199/month with US$899 down) for residents of California or Oregon.

For the US market, the Clarity Electric is equipped with a CCS Type 1 combo port for DC charging, which also accepts J1772 plugs for AC charging. A full charge requires approximately 3.5 hours on a 240 V AC charger, or 19 hours on a standard 120 V US wall outlet.

Production stopped for the Clarity Electric at the end of 2019.

=== Plug-in hybrid ===
Clarity Plug-in Hybrid
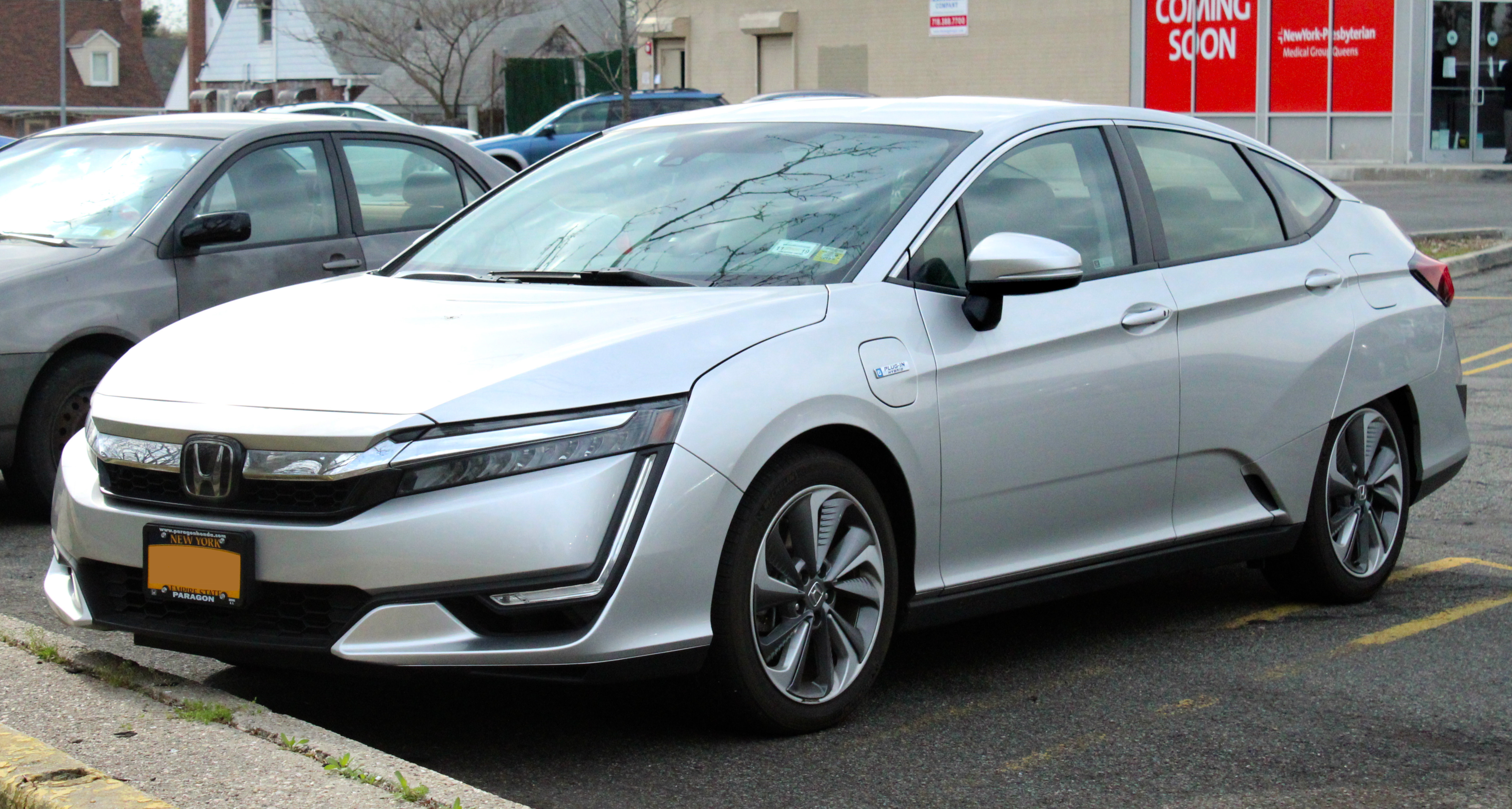

Overview
- Production: 2017–2021
- Model years: 2018–2021
- Assembly: Sayama, Japan

Powertrain
- Engine: 77 kW (103 hp) 1.5 L Honda LEB-series i-VTEC I4
- Electric motor: 135 kW (181 hp) AC Synchronous Permanent-Magnet Electric Motor
- Transmission: Single-speed Honda direct drive system called e-CVT
- Hybrid drivetrain: Plug-in hybrid
- Battery: 17 kWh
- Range: 76 km (47 mi) (all-electric); 550 km (340 mi) (combined)

Dimensions
- Wheelbase: 2,750 mm (108.3 in)
- Length: 4,915 mm (193.5 in)
- Width: 1,875 mm (73.8 in)
- Height: 1,480 mm (58.3 in)
- Curb weight: 1,838 kg (4,052 lb)

Chronology
- Predecessor: Honda Accord Plug-in Hybrid

The plug-in hybrid (PHEV) model was launched December 1, 2017 in the U.S. market with a starting MSRP of $34,290; it was eligible for the full $7,500 federal tax credit in the U.S. unlike some other PHEVs due to its larger battery size, along with other incentives for plug-ins in certain states. The Clarity PHEV has an EPA-rated all-electric range of 76 km (47 mi), with a total combined gas/electric range of 550 km (340 mi).

It is the only Clarity model available in all 50 U.S. states as well as Canada, where it was launched nationwide in the latter on December 14, 2017, starting at an MSRP of C$39,990, before available government incentives up to C$13,000.

For the North American market, the Clarity Plug-in Hybrid is equipped with a J1772 charge port for AC charging at up to 6.6 kW. A full charge takes approximately 2.5 hours at the full 6.6 kW speed (240 V 27.5 A), or 13 hours from a standard 120 V US wall outlet.

The Clarity PHEV was the only variant available in the Forest Blue Pearl exterior color. Other distinctive exterior features found only on the plug-in variant include a chrome bar above the front grille, chrome rear deck lid garnish, and a unique wheel design.

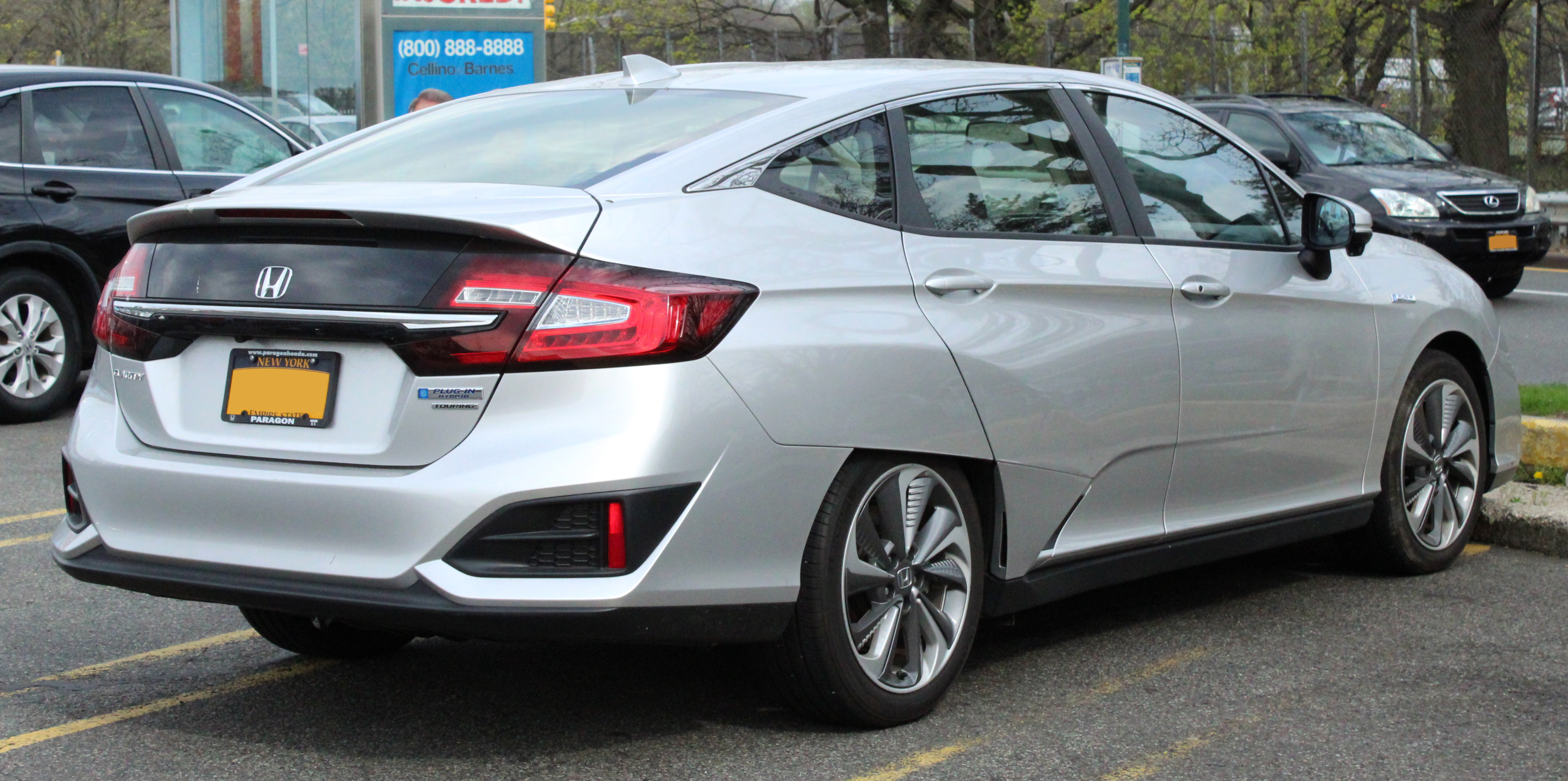
Rear view

The Clarity PHEV was subsequently released in Japan on July 20, 2018, with an MSRP of ¥5,880,600 including 8% consumption tax, with an advertised all-electric range of 114.6 km (71.2 mi) on the JC08 driving cycle or 101 km (63 mi) on the WLTP driving cycle. Compared to the North American model, the Japanese model includes an additional CHAdeMO DC fast charging connector, providing an 80% battery charge in 30 minutes.

For the 2020 model year, the Clarity received a new Acoustic Vehicle Alert System, which emits an audible noise when the car is driving at low speeds in pure electric mode.

In August 2019, Honda limited stock of the Clarity PHEV in the United States to only California dealerships, though it could still be ordered nationally. The Clarity PHEV was discontinued in 2021, along with the Fuel Cell model.

== Tax credits ==
=== FCX Clarity ===
On 25 July 2007 the United States Internal Revenue Service announced that the Honda FCX Clarity met the requirements of the Alternative Motor Vehicle Credit as a qualified fuel-cell motor vehicle. Purchasers of the 2005 and 2006 Honda FCX were eligible for a US$12,000 Section 30B(b) income tax credit, but consumers were not allowed to purchase the vehicle, as it was only available leased in Southern California, where public hydrogen refueling stations are available. The tax credit expired in 2014.

The leasing program began in July 2008 at a price of US$600 per month for three years which includes collision coverage, all maintenance and roadside assistance. Honda announced Power Honda Costa Mesa, Honda of Santa Monica and Scott Robinson Honda as the initial dealers, which were chosen for their proximity to hydrogen refueling stations.

=== Clarity FCV ===
The Clarity Fuel Cell was eligible for a federal tax credit of US$8,000, as the tax credit for fuel-cell vehicles was given in December 2015 a short-term extension through the end of 2016. As a zero-emission vehicle (ZEV), the Clarity FCV was eligible for a purchase or lease rebate in California of US$4,500 through the Clean Vehicle Rebate Project. However, Honda offered the Clarity FCV for lease, so the federal incentives were retained by Honda rather than the lessee; the lessee was able to receive the CVRP rebate from California.

=== Clarity Plug-in hybrid ===
Owners of the Clarity Plug-In Hybrid were eligible for a maximum US$7,500 tax credit through U.S. federal tax credit programs that ended 30 September, 2025.

== Pace car in IndyCar series ==
The Honda FCX Clarity was the pace car in 2008 Indy Japan 300 which took place at the Twin Ring Motegi in Tochigi, Japan, April 2008. It also served as the official pace car for the 2011 Honda Grand Prix of St. Petersburg in March 2011.

== Awards and recognition ==
- World Green Car of the Year - 2009
- 2008 Good Design Award from the Japan Industrial Design Promotion Organization
- "Most important car for 100 years" - BBC Top Gear

== See also ==
- List of fuel cell vehicles
- Honda e, with a similar drivetrain to the Clarity Electric.
