= Fuel cell forklift =

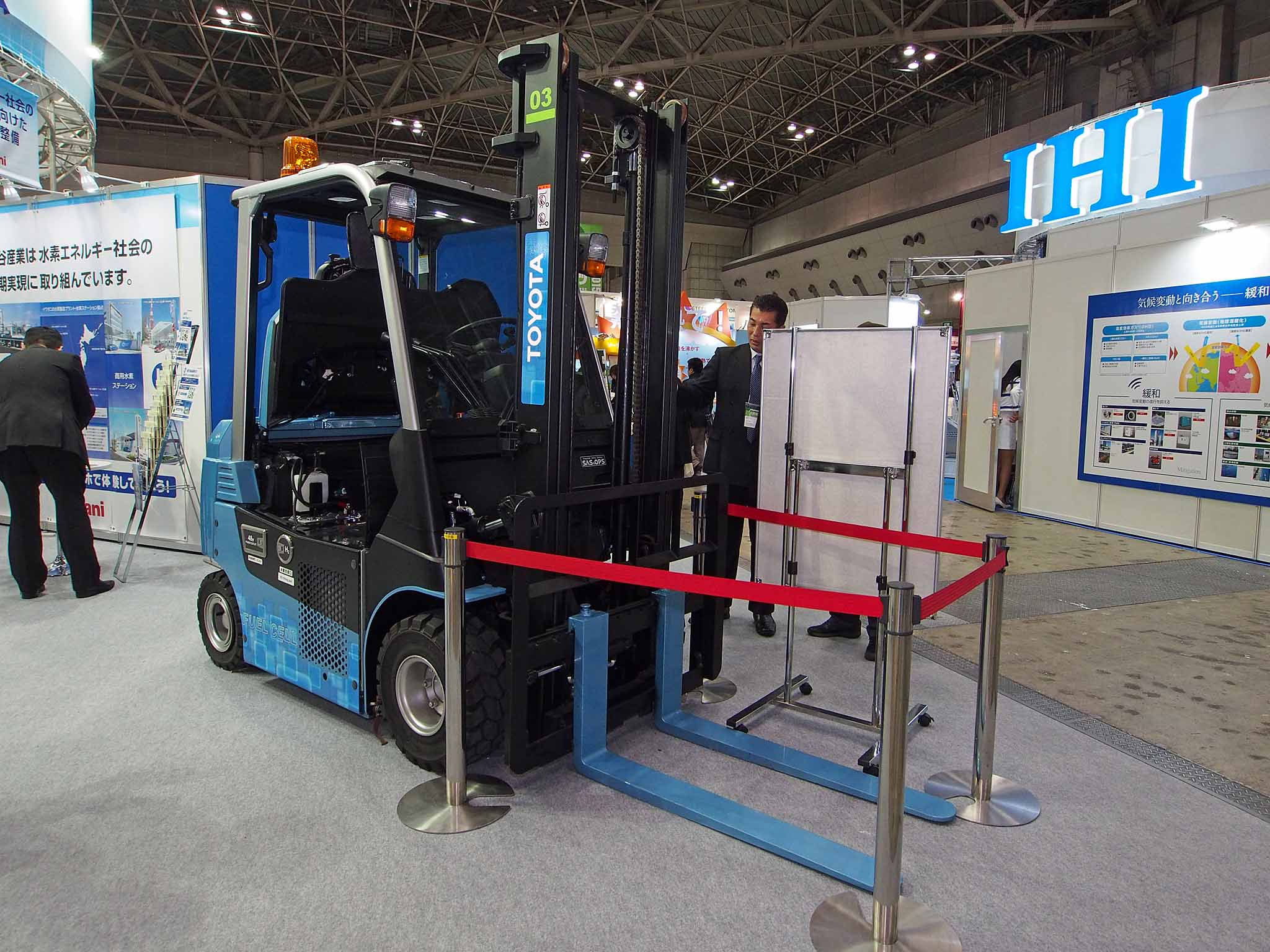
Toyota L&F fuel cell forklift, displayed at Eco-Products 2015.

A fuel cell forklift (also called a fuel cell lift truck) is a fuel cell powered industrial forklift used to lift and transport materials.

== History ==
- 1960 – Allis-Chalmers builds the first fuel cell forklift.

== Market ==
In 2013 there were over 4,000 fuel cell forklifts used in material handling in the United States. As of 2024, approximately 50,000 hydrogen forklifts are in operation worldwide (the bulk of which are in the U.S.), as compared with 1.2 million battery electric forklifts that were purchased in 2021.

== Uses ==
PEM fuel-cell-powered forklifts provide benefits over petroleum-powered forklifts as they produce no local emissions. While LP Gas (propane) forklifts are more popular and often used indoors, they cannot accommodate certain food sector applications. Fuel cell power efficiency (40–50%) is about half that of lithium-ion batteries (80–90%), but they have a higher energy density which may allow forklifts to run longer. Fuel-cell-powered forklifts are often used in refrigerated warehouses as their performance is not as affected by temperature as some types of lithium batteries. Most fuel cells used for material handling purposes are powered by PEM fuel cells, although some DMFC forklifts are coming onto the market. In design the FC units are often made as drop-in replacements.

== Research ==
- 2013 – Toyota Industries (Toyota Shokki) showcased a new fuel cell powered forklift, co-developed with Toyoda Gosei Co., Ltd.
- 2015 – HySA Systems (UWC) showcased a fuel cell powered forklift using a refueling station based on metal hydrides. The customer was Implats, a mining company in South Africa. This was the first project of this type on the African continent.

== Standards ==
- SAE J 2601/3 - SAE J 2601/3 - Fueling Protocols for Gaseous Hydrogen Powered Industrial Forklifts
