= Home Energy Saver =

Online home energy analysis tool

Home Energy Saver is a set of on–line resources developed by the U.S. Department of Energy at the Lawrence Berkeley National Laboratory intended to help consumers and professional energy analysts, analyze, reduce, and manage home energy use.

The Home Energy Saver energy assessment tool allows consumers to conduct a do-it-yourself home energy audit and provides specific recommendations to help lower household energy consumption and utility costs. By entering a zip code, users get estimates for typical and efficient homes in their area. The estimates break down energy consumption by "end use". End uses reported by Home Energy Saver include: heating, cooling, water heating, major appliances, small appliances, and lighting.

The more details a user enters, (e.g., insulation levels, roofing, age of major equipment, how systems are used) the more customized the assessment results and energy efficiency recommendations become. The tailored reports allows consumers to drill into estimated cost of improvements, anticipated payback time, projected utility bill savings, and how much energy use and green house gas production will be reduced. Consumers can vary the energy efficiency assumptions and the upgrade costs, (e.g., replacing the default values with actual estimates from contractors) and recalculate the payback times and other details.

The Home Energy Saver website includes a section called LEARN which offers tips about energy savings, an explanation of the house-as-system energy efficiency approach, and other information to help people understand how energy is used in a home.

When launched in 1994, Home Energy Saver was the first and only online home energy calculator. Thereafter, 6 million people have used it to analyze their home energy use. Nearly 1 million people visit the site each year. In 2009, a second version of the tool, Home Energy Saver Professional, was launched. This advanced version provides a low cost, interactive energy simulation/assessments tool for contractors, building professionals, weatherization professionals, and building designers.

== The Home Energy Simulation Model ==
The Home Energy Saver is built on DOE-2, a computer program for building heating and cooling energy analysis and design. DOE-2 performs a thermal load simulation that accounts for heating and cooling equipment and thermal distribution efficiencies, infiltration, and thermostat management. User-entered zip codes are mapped to one of about 300 unique "weather tapes" that impose a year's worth of local weather conditions on the home to determine heating and cooling needs.

Home Energy Saver extends DOE-2 in a number of ways to improve the simulation model. For example, when users enter their actual electricity tariffs, the predictive power of the model improves. Other methods are used to calculate the energy used by appliances, water heating, and lighting.

The public domain HES calculation methods and underlying data are clearly documented on the website. Other web-based tool developers are welcome to use this information at no cost, providing that the source is properly credited.

== Energy Saving Recommendations ==
The Home Energy Saver enables users to quantify the benefits of improving the energy efficiency and comfort of homes in the following ways:

- No Cost Changes – No cost changes are modifications to the way energy is used, like lowering the hot water heater temperature, unplugging the second refrigerator that is running to cool just a few things, doing laundry with cool or cold water instead of hot, or programming the thermostat a bit lower. These changes don't cost anything, but they can save a substantial amount of energy over time.
- Low Cost Changes – Low cost changes include actions like changing out incandescent light bulbs for compact fluorescent lamps (CFLs) or LED bulbs, wrapping a hot water heater in an insulating blanket, or weatherizing a home by caulking or adding weather stripping. Low cost changes are typically Do-It-Yourself tasks that can improve the energy efficiency of a home dramatically.
- Deep Home Energy Upgrades or Retrofits – Upgrades can include actions ranging from replacing old inefficient appliances with new Energy Star appliances, adding insulation, or replacing major systems like heating equipment or the roof.
- The Department of Energy tells us that, "A cool roof under the same conditions could stay more than 50°F cooler and save energy and money by using less air conditioning."

The energy improvement recommendations are drawn from the National Residential Energy Efficiency Measures Database.

== Awards and recognition ==
Each year, the R&D 100 Awards recognize the year's 100 most significant, innovative, newly introduced research and development advances. The awards are recognized in industry, government, and academia as proof that a product is one of the most innovative ideas of the year, nationally and internationally. Home Energy Saver and Hohm received an R&D 100 Award in 2010.

Home Energy Saver received the U.S. Department of Energy's "Energy 100" award as one of the best 100 scientific and technological accomplishments over DOE's 23-year lifetime. The discoveries were chosen based on their impact in saving consumers money and improving quality of life.

PC Magazine recognized Home Energy Saver in 2004 as one of the "Top 100 Undiscovered Websites.

MSN Money rates Home Energy Saver among the "Best Sites for Free Government Help" including it in the list of "The 100 most Useful Sites on the Internet.

== Licensing ==
Organizations who want to provide their customers tools to predict home energy consumption can license the Home Energy Saver Application Programming Interfaces (APIs).

Microsoft, the first organization to license the Home Energy Saver, uses it to drive Microsoft Hohm.
