= Honda FCX =

The Honda FCX (commonly referred to as Fuel Cell eXperimental) is a family of hydrogen fuel cell automobiles manufactured by Honda.

The Honda FCX and Toyota FCHV, which began leasing on December 2, 2002, became the world's first government-certified commercial hydrogen fuel cell vehicles.

As of March 2007, there are more than twenty Honda FCX vehicles in the hands of customers, including the state of New York, cities of Las Vegas, Chula Vista, San Francisco and the South Coast Air Quality Management District in three different American states.

Limited marketing of a latest fuel cell vehicle named FCX Clarity, based on the 2007 concept model, began on June 19, 2008 in Japan and the United States. Honda believes it could start mass-producing the next model evolved from the FCX concept by 2018.

== 1999 FCX concept and prototypes ==
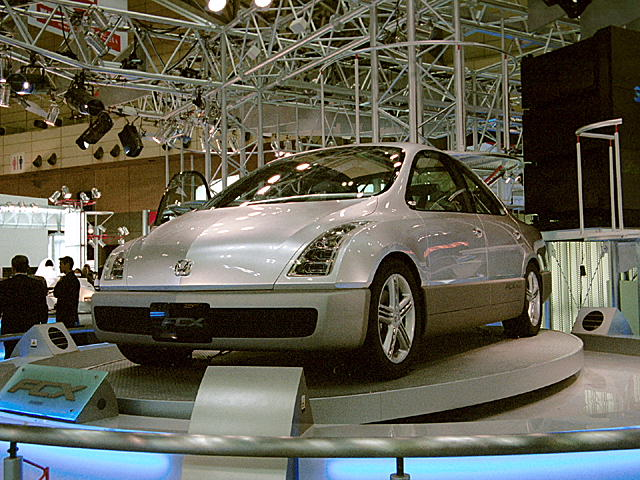
Honda FCX concept mock up, at Tokyo Motor Show 1999

The first prototype FCX is a four-door, four-seat vehicle that was launched in 1999. Dimensions are: length 4,165 mm (164.0 in), width 1,760 mm (69 in) and height 1,645 mm (64.8 in). The fuel cell was a PEFC (proton exchange membrane) manufactured by Ballard Power Systems. The fuel cell had power output of 78 kW.

The engine has a maximum output of 80 horsepower (60 kW), torque of 272 N⋅m (201 lb⋅ft) and has an EPA certified range of 170 miles (270 km).

The first vehicles were delivered on December 2, 2002, in the USA (City of Los Angeles) and Japan.

- 1999 September
  - Honda FCX-V1: Hydrogen vehicle model
  - Honda FCX-V2: Methanol-fuel cell model
- 2000 September
  - Honda FCX-V3: Supercapacitor model, began tests in the public roads
- 2001 September
  - Honda FCX-V4: evolved version of FCX-V3
- 2002 March
  - Honda FCX-V4 served as pace car at the Los Angeles Marathon
- 2002 July
  - FCX became the world's first fuel-cell car certified by the U.S. EPA and California Air Resources Board for commercial use
- 2002 December
  - Honda FCX: vehicles delivered to Japanese Prime Minister's office (Kantei) and Los Angeles City
- 2003 July
  - Honda supplied the world's first fuel-cell vehicle to a private corporation
- 2003 October
  - Honda FC Stack was released. It was capable of power generation at temperatures as low as −20 °C (−4 °F)
- 2004 April
  - FCX were leased to the City and County of San Francisco, California, USA
- 2004 June
  - FCX were leased to the South Coast Air Quality Management District
- 2004 July
  - FC Stack-equipped FCX received U.S. government certification for commercial use
- 2004 November
  - FCX was leased to the City of Chula Vista, California, USA
  - FC Stack-equipped FCX was leased to the State of New York and became the world's first delivery of fuel-cell vehicles to a cold-weather region
- 2005 January
  - FC Stack-equipped FCX delivered to Hokkaido Prefecture, Japan
- 2005 February
  - FCX vehicles leased to the City of Las Vegas, USA
- 2007 March
  - actress Q'orianka Kilcher leases Honda FCX and became the world's youngest individual customer of fuel cell vehicles
- 2001-2007
  - FCX was the official pace car of the Los Angeles Marathon

== 2002 FCX ==
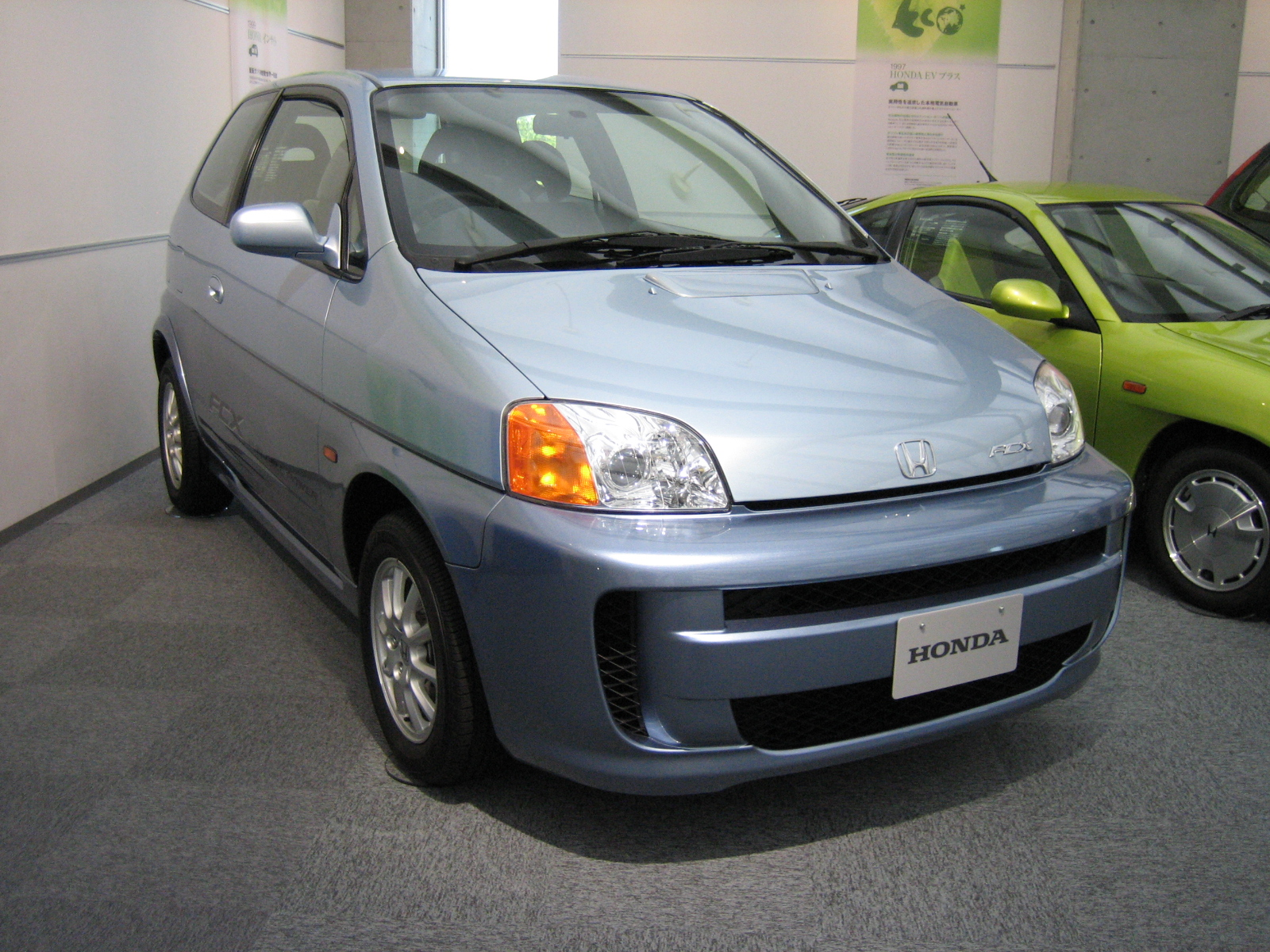
HONDA FCX (first delivered model), in 2002

This FCX uses front-wheel drive and is still a three-door four-seat hatchback vehicle like its predecessor. It has a maximum output of 80 kilowatts (107 horsepower) and 282 Nm (201 foot-pounds) of torque and has an operating range of 190 miles.

The 2005 FCX was the second-generation fuel-cell vehicle (FCV) from Honda. It was Honda's first fuel-cell vehicle powered by a fuel-cell stack designed and manufactured by Honda, and was certified by both the EPA and CARB for commercial use. It had an EPA city/highway rating of 62/51 mpkg (57 mpkg combined). It achieved a nearly 20-percent improvement in EPA fuel economy rating (51/46 mpkg (48 mpkg combined), a 33-percent gain in peak power (107 hp vs. 80 hp) and also a nearly 20-percent gain in operating range compared to the 2004 FCX (a range of 160 miles (260 km)). FCX was, according to Honda, the only fuel cell vehicle fully certified to meet the applicable federal government crash safety standards at the time. Later, with software upgrades for 2006 FCX, this was enhanced to an EPA certified 210 miles (340 km). The vehicle weighs in at 1,680 kg (3,700 lb) and has a maximum speed of 150 km/h (93 mph) and a 0–100 km/h (0–62 mph) acceleration time of 11 seconds. Main hydrogen components of the vehicle include fuel cell, two hydrogen tanks behind the rear and ultracapacitors.

This model used a fuel cell first developed in-house by Honda called the Honda FC Stack. The fuel cell was introduced in October 2003 and can operate at a low temperature of −20 °C (−4 °F). The type of fuel cell used is a Proton Exchange Membrane Fuel Cell. The fuel cell stack has a power of 86 kilowatts.

The hydrogen is stored into two separate containers behind the rear seat. They can accommodate a maximum of 4 kilograms (8.8 lb) of hydrogen.

The FCX is a fully featured automobile and has features like traction control, cruise control, automatic climate control, CD player, power windows, power locks and power heated mirrors. The FCX seats four adults comfortably. The only thing new for 2006 model year is the Satellite Navigation System.

Honda originally only leased the FCX to certain corporate and government entities. On 29 June 2005 Honda leased an FCX to its first non-commercial customer; the Spallino family of Southern California.

According to a New York Times article in 2005, Andy Boyd, a spokesman of Honda, was quoted that the FCX's estimated expense ($1 million to $2 million) is based on "the cost of body and powertrain, and also the experimental nature of some key components, like the fuel cell itself."

== 2006 FCX concept ==
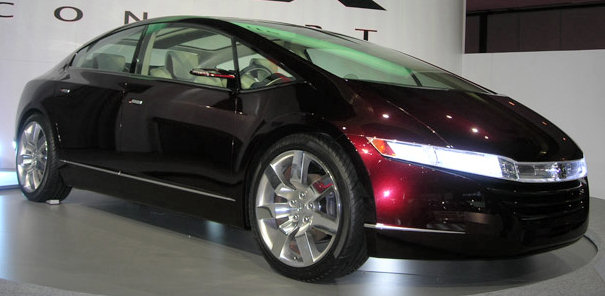
Honda FCX concept, 2006 Kuala Lumpur Motor Show

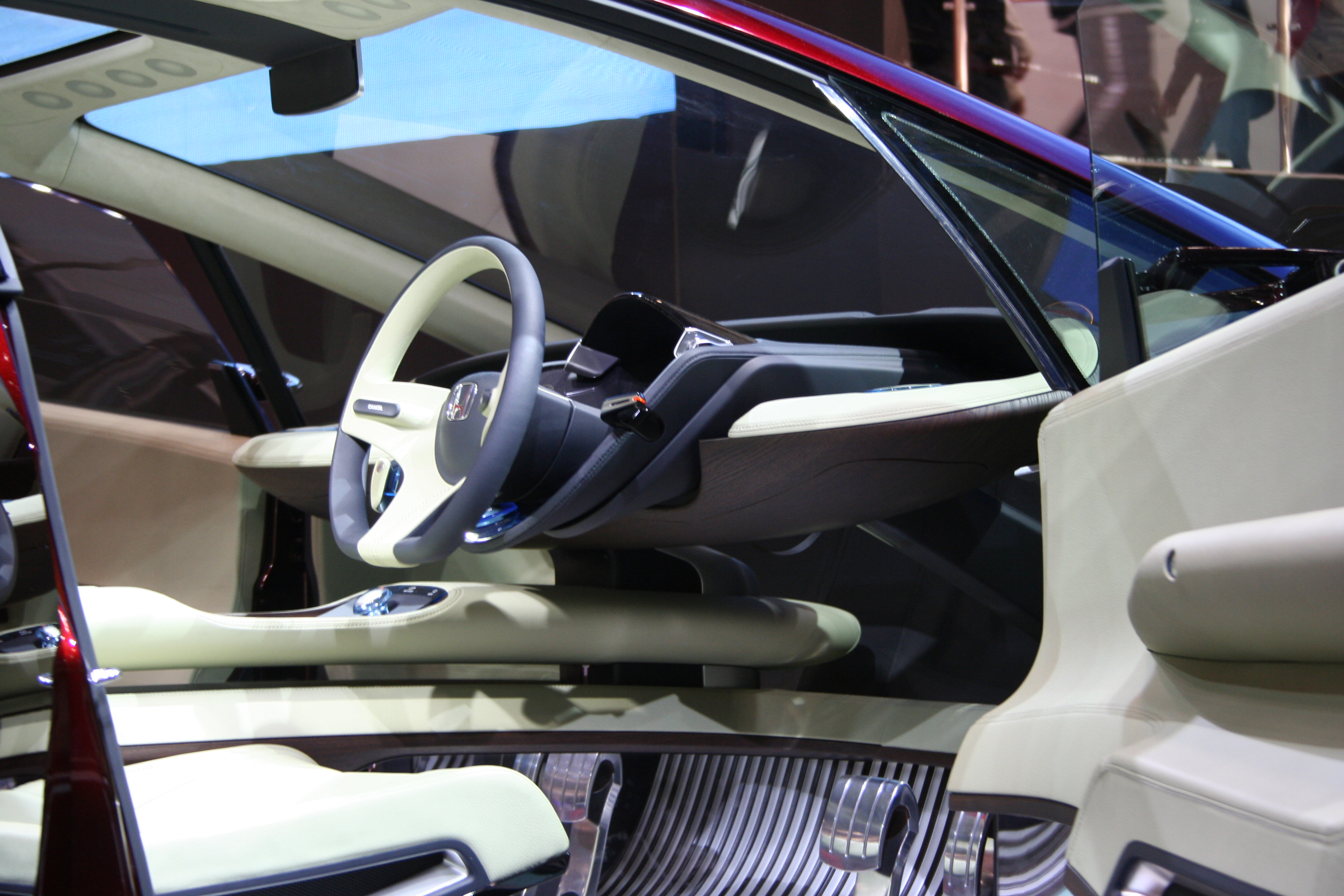
Honda FCX concept interior, 2005 Tokyo Motor Show

At the 2006 Detroit Auto Show, Honda announced that it would make a production version of the FCX concept shown at the 2005 Tokyo Motor Show. On 25 September 2006, this production version was unveiled. The updated four-door sedan version looks sleeker and more futuristic, and has a high focus on comfort and interior space. It has a much more spacious interior with a mixture of plastic, wood and leather. Production is expected to begin in 2008 in Japan and the U.S. The production version will closely resemble the concept, although it is unknown if some of the concept's more radical features, such as a tilting instrument panel, will be included.

According to Honda, the new fuel-cell stack is 20% smaller, 30% lighter and has a higher output of 100 kW (136 PS; 134 bhp) . The new powerplant is 180 kg lighter, 40% smaller in volume and has a high energy efficiency of 60%, compared with 20% for most internal combustion engines, 30% for most hybrid powerplants and 50% for the previous generation FCX.

The new powerplant utilizes three electric motors: one front-drive motor with an output of up to 80 kW, this motor's shaft is coaxial with the gearbox for a more compact front-end, and two smaller motors with a maximum output of 25 kW driving each of the rear wheels. This layout makes the FCX technically an all-wheel-drive vehicle. The updated FCX has a maximum speed of 160 km/h (100 mph).

The new FCX utilizes several interesting new features. The new V Flow fuel cell stack can operate at temperatures as low as −30 °C. This is achieved by allowing the hydrogen to flow vertically in the fuel cell stack. The tanks can store up to 5 kg (171 litres) of hydrogen at a pressure of 350 atmospheres, thanks to the new hydrogen absorption materials used. This allows a longer range of up to 350 miles (560 km).

To support the hydrogen fuel-cell technology, Honda also introduced the Home Energy Station (HES). This home solution can convert natural gas to electricity, heat and hydrogen to refuel fuel-cell vehicles. This allows consumers to refuel vehicles with hydrogen at home, important until hydrogen stations become widespread. Alternatively, the hydrogen can be used in the HES's built-in hydrogen fuel cell, providing up to 5 kW of normal or backup electricity and/or hot water for the home. According to Honda, this solution is highly efficient and reduces running costs of electricity, gas and vehicle fuel by up to 50%.

== 2008 FCX Clarity ==
Honda FCX Clarity
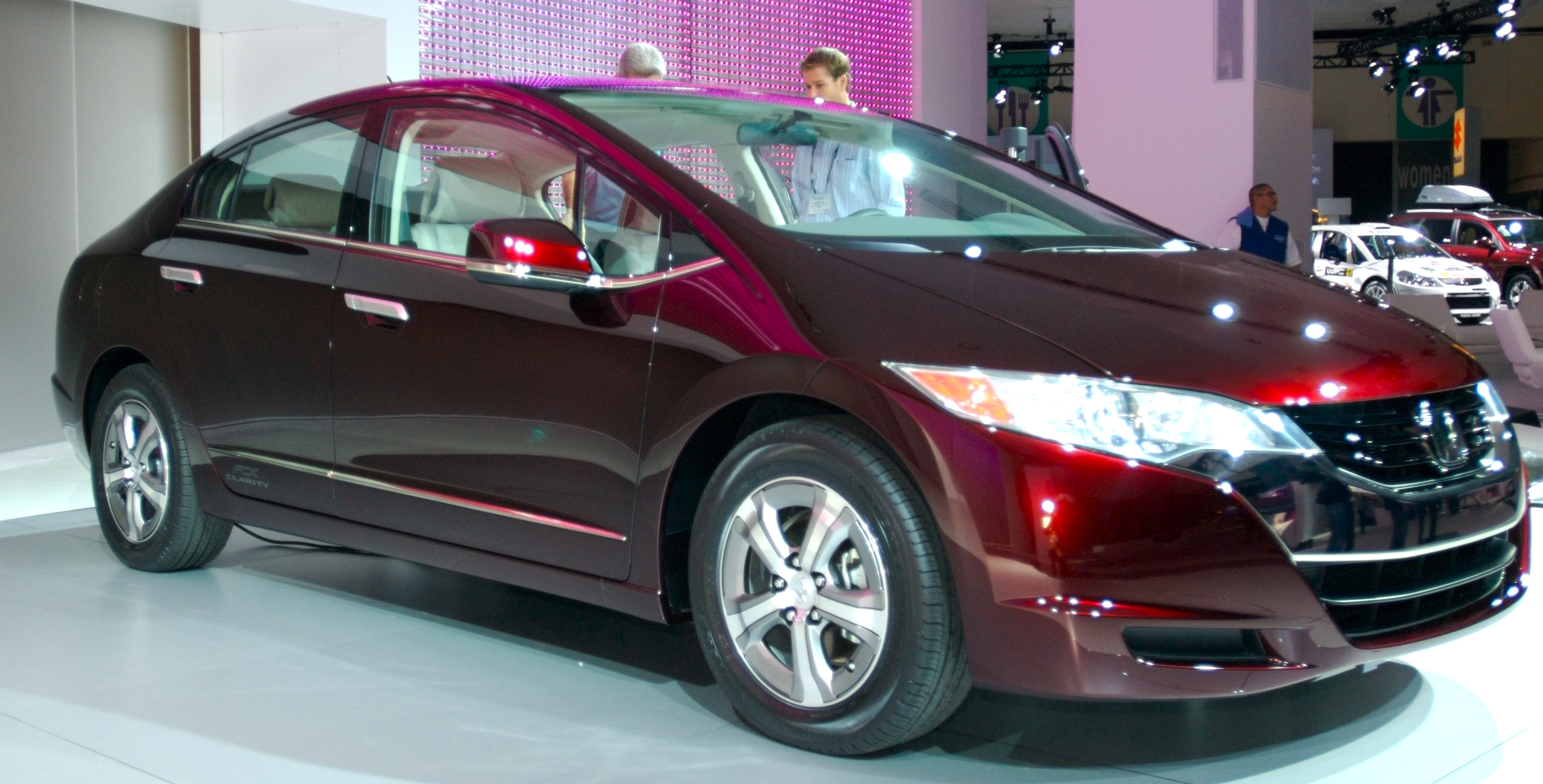

Overview
- Manufacturer: Honda
- Also called: Honda FCX
- Production: 2008–2014

Body and chassis
- Class: mid-size
- Body style: 4-door sedan
- Layout: FF layout

Powertrain
- Engine: electric motor

Dimensions
- Wheelbase: 110.2 in (2,799 mm)
- Length: 190.3 in (4,834 mm)
- Width: 72.7 in (1,847 mm)
- Height: 57.8 in (1,468 mm)
- Curb weight: 3,528 lb (1,600 kg)

On 15 November 2007 at the Greater Los Angeles Auto Show, Honda unveiled the FCX Clarity, the first production model, and announced that the car would be available for lease beginning in the summer 2008. Initial availability will be limited to the Southern California market, with availability expanding as hydrogen fueling stations become available. Leases will only be available for 36 months at $600 per month.
