= Bloom Energy =

American fuel cell company

Bloom Energy Corporation
- Formerly: Ion America Corp.
- Type: Public
- Traded as: NYSE: BE (class A); S&P 500 component
- Industry: electricity generation
- Founded: 2001; 25 years ago
- Founders: K.R. Sridhar, John Finn, Matthias Gottmann, James McElroy, Dien Nguyen
- Headquarters: North San Jose Innovation District, San Jose, California, United States
- Area served: Worldwide
- Key people: K.R. Sridhar (founder & CEO)
- Products: Solid Oxide Bloom Energy Server (Bloom Box) Hydrogen Fuel Cells; Bloom Electrolyzers
- Services: electricity generation
- Revenue: ▲US$2.024 billion (2025)
- Operating income: ▲US$73 million (2025)
- Net income: US$(87) million (2025)
- Total assets: ▲US$4.397 billion (2025)
- Total equity: ▲US$0.793 billion (2025)
- Number of employees: 2,214 (2025)
- Website: www.bloomenergy.com
- Footnotes; SEC Form 10-K

Bloom Energy Corporation (formerly Ion America Corp.) is an American public company that designs and manufactures solid oxide fuel cells (SOFCs) which produce electricity from natural gas onsite for data centers and commercial users. It was founded in 2001 and is headquartered in San Jose, California, United States. Its SOFCs generate electricity directly from natural gas, biogas, or hydrogen (rather than combusting the fuel in gas turbines coupled with electric generators as is done in standard natural gas plants). Its SOFCs are modular 65kW units that (in 2020) sold for about $1.2 million each and generated electricity for 13.5 cents per kilowatt hour. Bloom also developed electrolyzers for hydrogen production, and holds more than 1000 patents globally.

The company raised more than $1 billion in venture capital funding before going public in 2018, and has received significant government incentives that promote clean energy. By 2025, the company had installed about 1.4 gigawatts (GW) of Bloom Energy Server systems at over 1,000 locations across nine countries, and developed low-emission, always-on, near zero-carbon green energy and carbon capture technologies for high-energy consumption industries.

== History ==
The company was founded in 2001 as Ion America, then was renamed Bloom Energy in 2006. Bloom traces its roots to the work of KR Sridhar who created a technology to convert Martian atmospheric gases to oxygen for propulsion and life support, using a solid oxide fuel cell electrolyzer (SOEC), while director of the Space Technologies Laboratory at the University of Arizona. Sridhar and his team built an electrochemical cell for NASA that is capable of producing air and fuel from electricity generated by a solar panel. Bloom shipped its first 5 kW (kilowatt) unit to the University of Tennessee, where two years of field trials conducted in three U.S. states validated the technology. The first 100 kW commercial units, ES-5000 Energy Servers, were shipped to Google in July 2008.

The company worked in secret for eight years before coming out of stealth mode in February 2010, and introducing its Bloom Energy Server, or "Bloom Box", a fuel-cell technology that enables on-site carbon-neutral electricity generation. Bloom Energy was featured on 60 Minutes, supported by political figures and named one of 26 "2010 Tech Pioneers" by the World Economic Forum. The Bloom Box generator was also chosen among Time's "Best 50 Inventions of 2010". The company raised $400 million in funding that year, and had 300 employees. The San Francisco Chronicle later reported that Bloom had "a coming-out party packed with politicians and Silicon Valley elite".

In 2011, the company also began selling electricity produced by Bloom Energy Servers, rather than selling the units themselves, underwriting manufacture of the fuel cells. A federal subsidy for fuel cells expired in 2016, and the California Self-Generation Incentive Program was discontinued the following year, as the state focused its subsidies on batteries.

Bloom was valued at $2.9 billion in 2011, then producing about one Bloom Box per day, until opening a factory in Newark, Delaware, in April 2012. By 2013, it had raised $1.1 billion in funding, which was followed by additional funding rounds, in 2014 and 2015. Company revenues grew rapidly, though its development phase was unprofitable, in some years losing more than $200 million.

Federal subsidies that had expired in 2016 were restored in 2018. Bloom Energy filed an IPO that July, stating that it did not expect to be profitable in the near future, and disclosing a legal settlement with some of its investors. Later that year, Bloom moved headquarters from Sunnyvale to San Jose. By 2020, shares had lost nearly 50% in value. Though not profitable in its first 19 years of operation, the company had raised over $1.7 billion in capital for its technology. In July 2019, Duke Energy corporation announced the intention of acquiring a 37 MW portfolio of distributed SOFC technology projects from Bloom Energy. later reselling the distributed fuel-cell projects managed by Bloom to ArcLight Capital Partners, in October 2023.

In 2020, in preparation of a possible critical demand for ventilators during the COVID-19 pandemic; Bloom pivoted its operation to repair and refurbish ventilators for the state of California. and helped provide a mobile vaccination clinic to about 80,000 individuals. After generating hydrogen from its SOEC at NASA’s Ames Research Center in Mountain View, California, with 20–25% more efficiency than traditional methods; in November 2022, Bloom Energy's Delaware factory began manufacturing its high-volume commercial electrolyzer, the largest and most efficient in the world to date, producing 20-25% more hydrogen per MW than either proton exchange membrane (PEM) or alkaline electrolyzers.

In November 2024, Bloom Energy partnered with SK Eternix to power two Eco Parks with Bloom SOFCs by Spring 2026, in Chungju, North Chungcheong Province, South Korea, the largest fuel cell installation in history. The same month, the company agreed to expand its existing SOFC installation with Quanta Computers by 150%, in order to power critical artificial intelligence (AI) industry hardware, and was contracted by American Electric Power (AEP) to provide a GW of fuel cell capacity to industrial customers on-site, supporting an increasing demand for energy to fuel the needs of data centers, especially those powering AI.

In February 2025, digital infrastructure company Equinix increased its Bloom contract to more than 100 MW to power 19 of its data centers throughout the U.S. That month, the company also entered a partnership with Chart Industries to plan to use Chart's carbon capture and storage technology on the exhaust streams from Bloom's SOFC's.

In April 2026, Bloom Energy and Oracle announced a partnership for 2.8 gigawatts of Bloom Energy's fuel cell capacity. Oracle claimed that this partnership would "dramatically reduce water use" compared to using a previously planned natural gas power plant.

In July 2026, Bloom Energy reported record quarterly revenue of $1.07 billion (up 165% year-over-year), raised full-year 2026 revenue guidance to $3.9 to $4.2 billion, and disclosed a total backlog of approximately $20 billion including product backlog approaching $6billion.

== Products and services ==
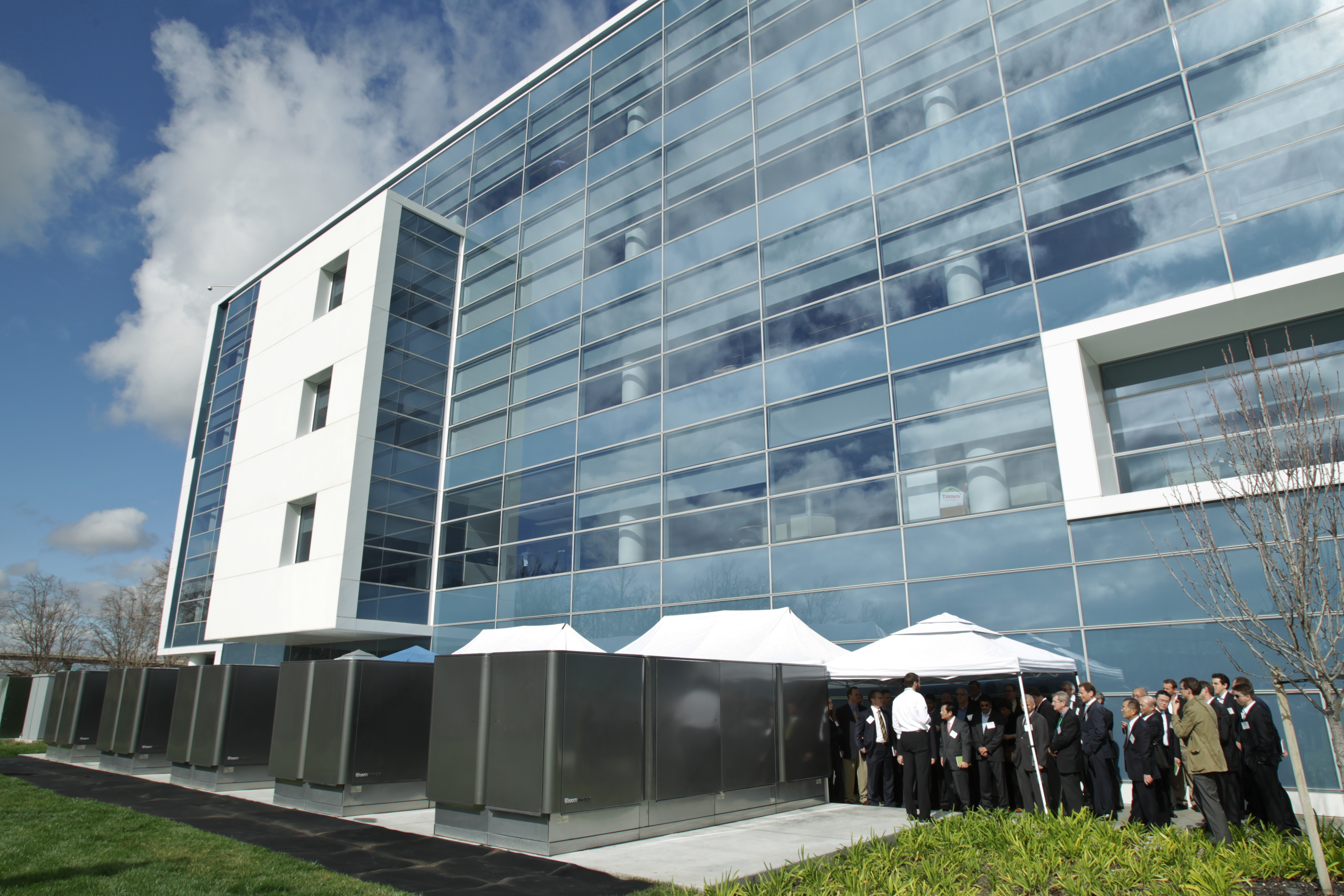
A deployment of Bloom Energy Servers outside eBay headquarters

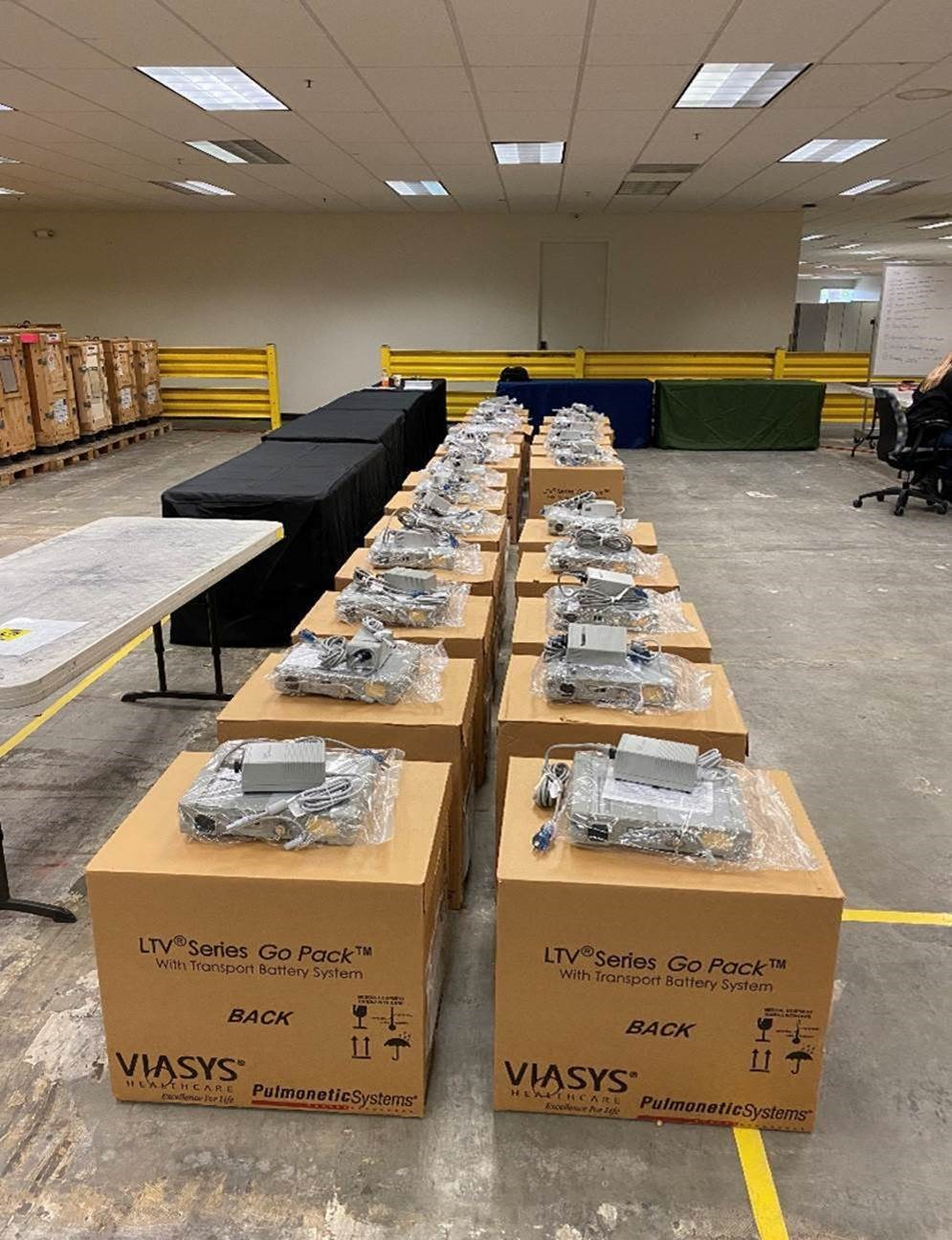
During the COVID-19 pandemic, Bloom Energy refurbished ventilators for the State of California to use in treatment of the virus in 2020.

Bloom Energy leverages natural gas and other fuels to create electricity through chemical reactions without combustion, and builds decentralized energy systems that produce electricity. The company designs, manufactures, markets, and installs SOFC power generators, branded as Bloom Energy Servers (also known as Bloom Boxes) that use fuel cells to convert natural gas, or biogas, into electricity for on-site power generation. According to The New York Times, SOFCs are "considered the most efficient but most technologically challenging fuel-cell technology." Instead of precious metals, Bloom Energy's fuel cells use wafers made from sand that are stained with proprietary ink. As fuel passes over the sand wafers, it mixes with oxygen, creating a chemical reaction that produces electricity. The chemical reaction takes place at about 800 degrees Celsius (1,500 degrees Fahrenheit).

Bloom Energy Server systems are typically installed at customer locations, with long-term contracts to supply electricity. The units can be installed as a micro power grid in a small community, or be clustered together to create an energy farm for large-scale utility. Bloom Boxes are often used for on-site power generation at data centers, being a primary driver of rising electricity demand, as well as health centers, manufacturing facilities, and other large buildings. Power produced by company-owned distributed power generators is offered at a rate 5-15% lower than the local power grid.

The fuel cells are housed in metal cabinets, with each producing about 200 to 300 kilowatts (kW) of electricity. As of 2018, Bloom had installed about 300 megawatts of units. Delaware state data found, in 2014, that Bloom's fuel cells produce about 823 pounds of carbon dioxide per megawatt hour (MWh), less than the approximately 1,000 pounds produced when power is taken from the electrical grid, and higher than the 777 Bloom used to advertise, without calculating the decline in efficiency of the appliances as they age.

== See also ==
- Bloom Energy Server
- Fuel cell power plant
