= K. R. Sridhar =

Indian-American engineer (born c. 1960)

KR Sridhar
- Born: கே.ஆர். ஸ்ரீதர் 1960 (age 65–66); Tamil Nadu, India
- Occupations: CEO, Bloom Energy; Former director, Space Technologies Laboratory
- Years active: 1989 – present
- Known for: Bloom Energy Server
- Notable work: "Oxygen production on Mars using solid oxide electrolysis"
- Website: Bloom Energy

KR Sridhar (born c. 1960) is an Indian American engineer, inventor, professor, and entrepreneur. He is the founder, chairman, and chief executive officer (CEO) of Bloom Energy. Prior, Sridhar was a professor of Aerospace and Mechanical Engineering and the Director of the Space Technologies Laboratory (STL) at the University of Arizona. He worked with and advised NASA, and is a member of the National Academy of Engineering.

== Education ==
Sridhar was awarded a bachelor's degree in mechanical engineering from the National Institute of Technology at Tiruchirappalli, Tamil Nadu, India in 1982. He moved to the United States and gained an M.S. in nuclear engineering and a Ph.D. in mechanical engineering from University of Illinois at Urbana-Champaign in 1989.

== Career ==
He was the director of the Space Technologies Laboratory at the University of Arizona, where he was also a professor of Aerospace and Mechanical Engineering. Under Sridhar, STL won several government contracts to conduct research and development for Mars exploration and NASA flight experiments to Mars.

Sridhar was recognized in 2000 by Fortune as one of five young innovators practically advancing human progress. With the cooling of space exploration activity, in the wake of the Cold War; he next co-founded Ion America, later Bloom Energy, to develop decentralized energy systems, in 2001.

He was named one of Time's "Tech Pioneers Who Will Change Your Life" in 2009, and received the University of Illinois Department of Mechanical Science Engineering Distinguished Alumnus award in 2011. In 2016, Sridhar was inducted into the National Academy of Engineering (NAE) He received an honorary degree from the University of Delaware in 2024.

Sridhar has served as a Trustee at The Nueva School, a partner at Kleiner Perkins, a director at Range Fuels, and is an independent director at C3.ai. He holds several patents, and has authored and co-authored numerous scientific works. He is a member of the American Society of Mechanical Engineers and the American Institute of Aeronautics and Astronautics.

=== Oxygen production on Mars ===
The Space Technologies Laboratory was asked by NASA to undertake research into how life could be made sustainable on Mars. The team built an oxygen generation system (OGS) that could use solar power and water obtained from the planet to power a reactor cell that made oxygen to breathe and hydrogen to power vehicles.

Sridhar led a project that built a Mars oxygen production cell using a yttria-stabilized zirconia solid-electrolyte ionic conductor to electrolyze carbon dioxide into oxygen and carbon monoxide. The oxygen production unit was to fly as part of the Mars ISPP Precursor (MIP) experiment package that was to be sent to Mars on the Mars Surveyor 2001 Lander mission. The planned Mars Oxygen ISRU Experiment continued Sridhar's OGS work, and was scheduled to have been the first demonstration of in-situ resource utilization ("ISRU") for propellant production on another planet.

=== Bloom Energy ===
After NASA cancelled the Mars Surveyor 2001 mission, Sridhar started working on using oxygen and hydrogen to create power. He co-founded Ion America the same year, with a mission to "make clean, reliable energy affordable for everyone on earth". Sridhar became the chief executive officer. In 2002, the company moved to the NASA Ames Research Center in Silicon Valley, then changed its name to Bloom Energy in 2006.

On 24 February 2010, Bloom Energy launched Sridhar's newest invention, the Bloom Energy Server, also known as the Bloom Box, an energy-efficient and environmentally-friendly fuel cell in which natural gas and atmospheric oxygen are pumped through a stack of cells, producing electricity. The energy is clean and inexpensive, but development and production of the solid oxide fuel cells require an initial investment of $100 million. Sridhar obtained funding for the project from investors, including Kleiner Perkins and New Enterprise Associates.

During the COVID-19 pandemic, in 2020, while directing Bloom's engineers to refurbish broken ventilators; he also negotiated for the technology for a rapid test of four hours on behalf of Silicon Valley, replacing a four-to-five day test.

Following the declaration of a National Energy Emergency by Executive Order of President Donald Trump, on January 20, 2025; Sridhar stated, during a televised interview, that the rise of AI is creating an unprecedented demand for power, and that on-site power generation like the Bloom Box offers an agile service to meet the growing energy boom, without further burdening existing power grids. That April, during an E&E News ClimateWire Q&A, he reported that Bloom fuel cells are servicing data center energy needs with less climate pollution and lower costs than gas plants.
