= Meilin Liu =

American materials scientist

- Born: Xi'an, China
- Education: South China University of Technology (B.S., 1982); University of California, Berkeley (M.S., 1986; Ph.D., 1989)
- Known for: Solid oxide fuel cells and electrolyzers High-power lithium-ion batteries
- Scientific career
- Fields: Materials Science
- Workplaces: Georgia Institute of Technology

Meilin Liu is a materials scientist and engineer. He is the Hightower Chair and serves as Regents Professor in the School of Materials Science and Engineering at the Georgia Institute of Technology.

Liu's research focuses on the development of functional materials for energy storage and conversion, including solid oxide fuel cells, electrolyzers, and lithium batteries.

== Early life and education ==
Liu was born in Xi'an, China. He received a B.S. in materials science and engineering from South China University of Technology in 1982. He earned an M.S. in 1986 and a Ph.D. in 1989 from the University of California, Berkeley.

== Career ==
Liu joined the Georgia Institute of Technology in 1992 as an assistant professor in the School of Materials Science and Engineering. He was promoted to associate professor in 1996, full professor in 2000, and Regents' Professor in 2008. He held the B. Mifflin Hood Endowed Chair from 2015 to 2021 and has held the Hightower Endowed Chair since 2021. He previously served as Associate Chair of the School from 2012 to 2022.

His research focuses on the design, fabrication, and characterization of materials for energy storage and conversion. This includes work on electrolytes, electrodes, catalysts, and interfaces for solid oxide fuel cells, electrolyzers, and lithium batteries. He is a co-founder of PolyPlus Battery Company and holds 33 U.S. patents. Liu has been recognized as a Highly Cited Researcher by Clarivate since 2018. In 2024, he was elected a Fellow of the European Academy of Sciences (EurASc).
