= CFCL =

CFCL may refer to:

- Ceramic Fuel Cells Ltd - Australian company producing solid oxide fuel cells
- CFCL-TV, a defunct television station (channel 6) in Timmins, Ontario, Canada, now operating as CBLT-7
- CHYK-FM, a radio station (104.1 FM) licensed to Timmins, Ontario, Canada, which held the call sign CFCL from 1951 to 1990
