= McPhy Energy =

French energy company

- Industry: research and development in other physical and natural sciences
- Headquarters: France
- Key people: TBD (general manager)
- Website: mcphy.com

McPhy Energy (or McPhy) is a French energy company specialized in hydrogen.

The company is notably specialized in the manufacturing of electrolyzers and hydrogen stations for mobility.

== History ==
The company was founded in 2008.

In October 2020, McPhy CEO Laurent Carme confirmed that its business model would remain based both on the sale of electrolyzers and on that of charging stations.

In 2022, McPhy inaugurated its new factory dedicated to hydrogen mobility in Grenoble.

In 2024, the company inaugurated its first electrolyzer factory in France, in Belfort. It is the first French electrolyzer factory.

In April 2025, the company is up for sale. John Cockerill is reported to have expressed interest in acquiring the operations of the French electrolyzer manufacturer McPhy through the Belfort court. At the same time, McPhy's CEO steps down from his position.
