= LSC =

LSC may refer to:

== Astronomy ==
- Local Supercluster
  - Virgo Supercluster

== Science and technology ==
- Lanthanum strontium cobaltate, see lanthanum strontium cobalt ferrite
- Shaped charge#Linear shaped charges
- LIGO Scientific Collaboration
- Message Sequence Chart#Live Sequence Charts
- Luminescent solar concentrator
- Lichen simplex chronicus
- LDAP Synchronization Connector, an open source software to synchronize an LDAP directory with any other data source.
- Landing Support Craft, a British WWII landing craft, US called Landing Craft Assault
- Landing Ship, Carrier (Derrick-Hoisting) a US WW2 landing craft with a crane.

== Places ==
- Lafayette School Corporation, Indiana, US
- Lake Superior College, Duluth, Minnesota, US
- La Salle College, Hong Kong
- Lyndon State College, Vermont, US
- London School of Commerce, London, UK
- LSC, the IATA code for La Florida Airport, serving La Serena, Chile

== Other ==
- LStar Capital, also known as LSC Film Corporation, a film production company that works with Sony Pictures
- Learning and Skills Council, former UK body
- Legal Services Commission, England, replaced by Legal Aid Agency
- Legal Services Corporation, US corporation providing legal aid
- Legend SuperCup, a legends car racing series since 2014
- Lengua de Señas Colombiana, the Colombian sign language
- Llengua de Signes Catalana, the Catalan sign language
- Local School Councils, Chicago, US
- Local Swimming Committee, a subdivision of USA Swimming
- London Society of Compositors, former British trade union
- London Symphony Chorus, UK
- Lone Star Conference, an athletic conference affiliated in the Division II ranks of the National Collegiate Athletic Association (NCAA)
- LSC, a coupe model of the Continental Mark VII and Lincoln Mark VII
