= Green Hydrogen Catapult =

International advocacy group

- Founded: 8 December 2020
- Type: Advocacy group
- Purpose: Green hydrogen
- Origins: United Nations, RMI
- Region served: Worldwide
- Website: greenh2catapult.com

Green Hydrogen Catapult is a advocacy group focused on green hydrogen. Launched in 2020 by the United Nations, and supported by RMI, it agitates to bring the cost of green hydrogen (hydrogen produced using renewable power) below US$2 per kilogram (equivalent to $50 per megawatt hour) by 2026.

Although similar in objectives, the Green Hydrogen Catapult is unrelated to the Catapult centres of the United Kingdom.

== Founding members ==
- ACWA Power
- CWP Renewables
- Envision Energy (not listed on GHC's members page as at Jan 2022)
- Iberdrola
- Ørsted
- Snam
- Yara International

== Subsequent members ==
- Fortescue Future Industries
- Mærsk Mc-Kinney Møller Center for Zero Carbon Shipping
- H2 Green Steel
