= Green hydrogen =

Hydrogen produced by renewable energy

Green hydrogen (GH2 or GH_{2}) is hydrogen produced by the electrolysis of water using renewable electricity. Production of green hydrogen causes significantly lower greenhouse gas emissions than production of grey hydrogen, which is derived from fossil fuels without carbon capture.

Green hydrogen's principal purpose is to help limit global warming, reduce fossil fuel dependence by replacing grey hydrogen, and provide for an expanded set of end-uses in specific economic sectors, sub-sectors and activities. These end-uses may be technically difficult to decarbonize through other means such as electrification with renewable power. Its main applications are likely to be in heavy industry (e.g. high temperature processes alongside electricity, feedstock for production of green ammonia and organic chemicals, as direct reduction steelmaking), shipping, and long-term energy storage.

As of 2024, low-emission hydrogen, including both blue and green hydrogen, accounted for less than 1% of global hydrogen production, with green hydrogen only making up around 12% of all low-emission hydrogen production. Green hydrogen is more costly to produce compared to all other methods of hydrogen production, however, with new technological developments as well as the increasing cost of natural gas, the cost gap is expected to narrow by 2030.

== Definition ==
Most commonly, green hydrogen is defined as hydrogen produced by the electrolysis of water, using renewable electricity. In this article, the term green hydrogen is used with this meaning.

Precise definitions sometimes add other criteria. The global Green Hydrogen Standard defines green hydrogen as "hydrogen produced through the electrolysis of water with 100% or near 100% renewable energy with close to zero greenhouse gas emissions." In integrated cases water can also provide services back to the renewable energy source such as when water cools floatovoltaics (floating solar photovoltaics) to improve efficiency of solar energy conversion, which in turn is used to generate green hydrogen from the water.

A broader, less-used definition of green hydrogen also includes hydrogen produced through various other methods that produce relatively low emissions and meet other sustainability criteria. For example, these production methods may involve nuclear energy or biomass feedstocks.

== Electrolysis ==
Green hydrogen is primarily produced by electrolysis, in which electricity from renewable sources is used to split water (H_{2}O) into hydrogen (H_{2}) and oxygen (O_{2}). The process is at most 80% efficient. Producing a kilogram of hydrogen through electrolysis requires around nine litres of water.

The business consortium Hydrogen Council said that, as of December 2023, manufacturers are preparing for a green hydrogen expansion by building out the electrolyzer pipeline by 35 percent to meet the needs of more than 1,400 announced projects.

=== Main methods ===
- Alkaline Electrolyzers (AE): A mature and cost-effective technology used primarily for large-scale, steady hydrogen production. They operate at 70–90 °C using a potassium hydroxide electrolyte and non-precious metal electrodes. While robust, they are less suited for intermittent renewable energy sources.
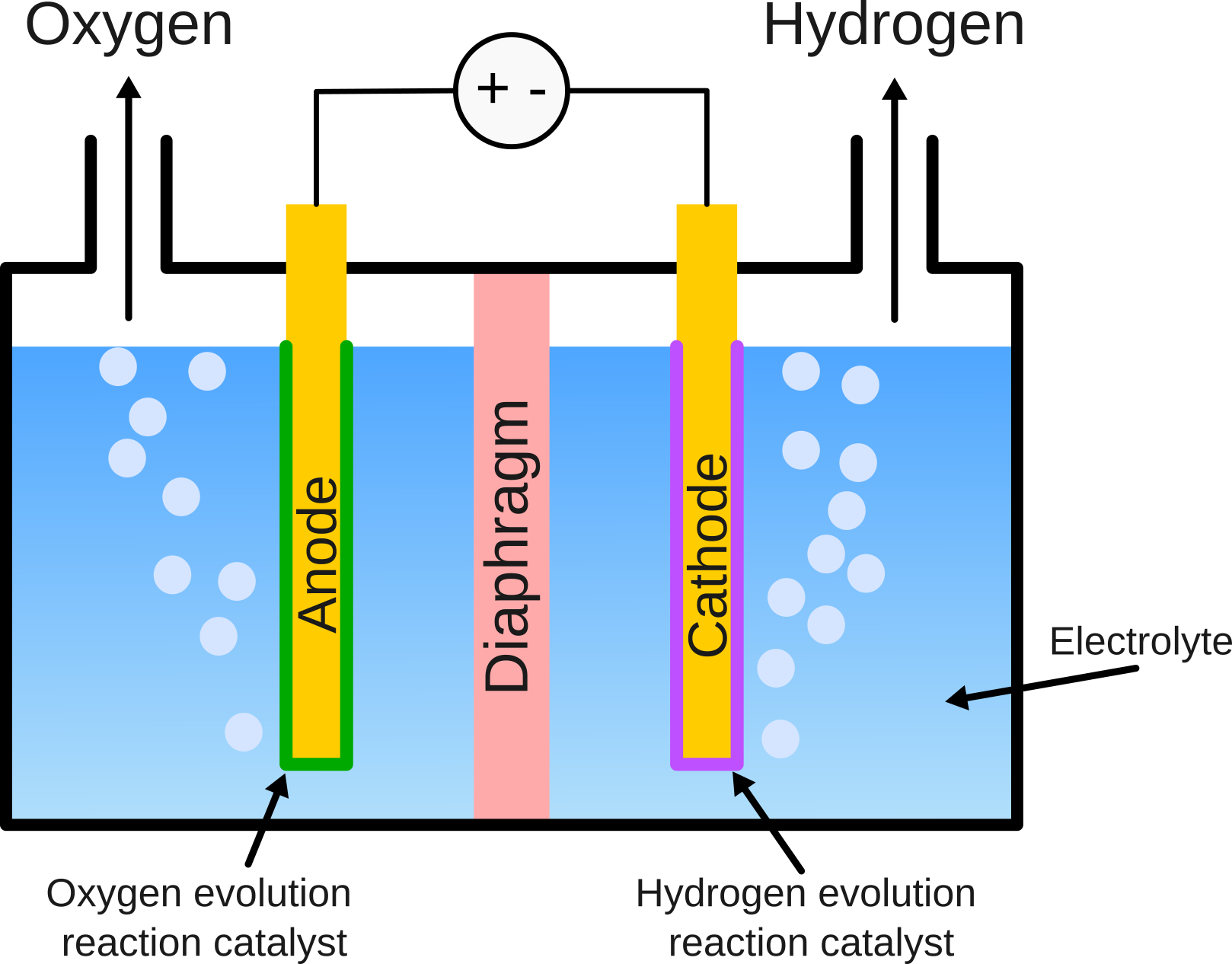
  Diagram of an alkaline electrolyser, a common technology for green hydrogen production.
- Proton Exchange Membrane Electrolyzers (PEM): Known for compact design and high responsiveness, PEM systems operate at 50–80 °C and produce high-purity hydrogen. Their ability to quickly adjust to fluctuating power makes them ideal for coupling with wind and solar, though reliance on platinum and iridium raises capital costs. Current research targets alternative electrodes and recycling strategies.

Animated schematic of a proton exchange membrane (PEM) electrolyzer showing water inlet, proton exchange membrane, and hydrogen/oxygen outlets.

- Solid Oxide Electrolyzers (SOEC): Operating at 500–1000 °C, SOECs convert electrical and thermal energy into hydrogen with high efficiency. They are well-suited for integration with industrial heat sources or for co-electrolysis of steam and CO_{2} to form syngas. Challenges include high material stress and slow dynamic response.
- Anion Exchange Membrane Electrolyzers (AEM): AEMs are emerging as promising systems that blend AE affordability with PEM flexibility. Designed to use non-noble metals and solid electrolytes, they offer lower-cost solutions with improved dynamic performance.

=== Alternative production pathways ===
The following methods are being investigated but have not translated to large scale production.

- Photoelectrochemical (PEC) Water Splitting: Merging light capture and electrolysis using semiconductor-based cells to mimic photosynthesis. Stable photoelectrodes and scalable device design.
- Biological Hydrogen Production: Leveraging algae and bacteria in biophotolysis or dark fermentation are under active research investigation. While environmentally promising, low yields remain a barrier.
- Thermochemical Water Splitting: Using High heat from nuclear or solar sources to trigger chemical water-splitting reactions in solar-rich regions and industrial symbiosis.
- Biochar-assisted: Biochar-assisted water electrolysis (BAWE) reduces energy consumption by replacing the oxygen evolution reaction (OER) with the biochar oxidation reaction (BOR). An electrolyte dissolves the biochar as the reaction proceeds. A 2024 study claimed that the reaction was 6× more efficient than conventional electrolysis, operating at <1 V, without O_{2} production using ~250 mA/gcat H_{2} current at 100% Faradaic efficiency. The process could be driven by small-scale solar or wind power.Cow manure biochar operated at only 0.5 V, better than materials such as sugarcane husks, hemp waste, and paper waste. Almost 35% of the biochar and solar energy was converted into hydrogen. Biochar production (via pyrolysis) is not carbon neutral.
- Scrap iron: Green hydrogen generation is possible from scrapped iron by reacting with water in an exothermic reaction. It is called steam-iron process and a production method is called Lane hydrogen producer. Good quality magnetite, (3Fe + 4H_{2}O → 4H_{2} + Fe_{3}O_{4}), is a valuable byproduct.
- Scrap aluminum: Green hydrogen production is possible from scrapped aluminum by reacting with water in an exothermic reaction. Good quality aluminum hydroxide and heat are valuable byproducts.

== Uses ==
Hydrogen has the most potential to reduce greenhouse gas emissions when used in chemical production, refineries, international shipping, and steelmaking, according to the International Renewable Energy Agency.

There is potential for green hydrogen to play a significant role in decarbonising energy systems where there are challenges and limitations to replacing fossil fuels with direct use of electricity.

Hydrogen fuel can produce the intense heat required for industrial production of steel, cement, glass, and chemicals, thus contributing to the decarbonisation of industry alongside other technologies, such as electric arc furnaces for steelmaking. However, it is likely to play a larger role in providing industrial feedstock for cleaner production of ammonia and organic chemicals. For example, in steelmaking, hydrogen could function as a clean energy carrier and also as a low-carbon fuel replacing coal-derived coke.

Hydrogen used to decarbonise transportation is likely to find its largest applications in shipping, aviation and to a lesser extent heavy goods vehicles, through the use of hydrogen-derived synthetic fuels such as ammonia and methanol, and fuel cell technology. As an energy resource, hydrogen has a superior energy density (39.6 kWh/kg) versus batteries (0.15-0.25 kWh/kg for lithium batteries). For light duty vehicles including passenger cars, hydrogen is far behind other alternative fuel vehicles, especially compared with the rate of adoption of battery electric vehicles, and may not play a significant role in future.

Green hydrogen can also be used for long-duration grid energy storage, and for long-duration seasonal energy storage. It has been explored as an alternative to batteries for short-duration energy storage.

Hydrogen can be combined with carbon dioxide to produce green methanol, a liquid fuel.

== Market ==
As of 2022, the global hydrogen market was valued at $155 billion and was expected to grow at an average (CAGR) of 9.3% between 2023 and 2030. Of this market, green hydrogen accounted for about $4.2 billion (2.7%). Due to the higher cost of production, green hydrogen represents a smaller fraction of the hydrogen produced compared to its share of market value. The majority of hydrogen produced in 2020 was derived from fossil fuel. 99% came from carbon-based sources. Electrolysis-driven production represents less than 0.1% of the total, of which only a part is powered by renewable electricity.

As of 2024, producing green hydrogen costs around 1.5 to six times more than producing hydrogen from fossil fuels without carbon capture. The current high cost of production is the main factor limiting the use of green hydrogen. A price of $2/kg is considered by many to be a potential tipping point that would make green hydrogen competitive against grey hydrogen.

Green hydrogen production costs are forecasted to fall due to declines in the costs of renewable electricity and electrolysers. The cost of solar and wind power declined dramatically from 2009 to 2024. Analysts project that electrolyser costs will decline as the green hydrogen industry grows, due to economies of scale and learning-by-doing. The cost of electrolysers fell by 60% from 2010 to 2022, though it rose 50% between 2021 and 2024. Carbon taxes on grey hydrogen would contribute to making green hydrogen cost-competitive.

In 2025 the IEA forecast a likely production of 37 million tonnes in 2030, a reduction of 12 million from its 2024 forecast. IEA executive Fatih Birol said that there were concerns that hydrogen has gone through another hype cycle, just like in the 1970s, 1990s and early 2000s.

== Production facilities ==
As of 2023, the global hydrogen market is about 97,000 thousand tonne per year (kt/y). Of this, approximately 4,687 kt/y (~5%) is blue hydrogen, and 146 kt/y (0.15%) is green hydrogen. In 2023, the IEA estimate that 218 kt/y of green hydrogen production capacity had been installed globally. The green hydrogen is manufactured in the following facilities, and others. Some of these feed directly into green ammonia plants or other uses for hydrogen.

Current operational hydrogen production facilities with production capacity over 2kt/y
Facility name	Date production started	Production kt/y	Country
Songyuan Hydrogen Energy Industrial Park	2025	45.0	China
Sinopec Kuqa Xinjiang Green Hydrogen Plant	2023	44.1	China
Ningxia Baofeng Energy Group	2021	25.6	China
Industrias Cachimayo	1965	4.2	Peru
Inner Mongolia Energy Department	2021	12.0	China
Cavendish NextGen Hydrogen Hub	2023	3.7	United States
Shell China - Zhangjiakou	2022	3.4	China
Iberdrola - Puertollano I	2022	3.0	Spain
Air Liquide Becancour	2020	3.0	Canada
Trailblazer - Siemens-Air Liquide Oberhausen, Phase 1	2024	3.0	Germany
EBIC - Ammonia plant -phase 1	2022	2.2	Egypt
PetroChina Yumen Oilfield - Phase 1	2023	2.0	China

== Projects ==
=== Australia ===
In 2020, the Australian government fast-tracked approval for the world's largest planned renewable energy export facility in the Pilbara region. In 2021, energy companies announced plans to construct a "hydrogen valley" in New South Wales at a cost of $2 billion to replace the region's coal industry. This has been cancelled.

As of July 2022, the Australian Renewable Energy Agency (ARENA) had invested $88 million in 35 hydrogen projects ranging from university research and development to first-of-a-kind demonstrations. By 2022, ARENA was expected to finalize two or three of Australia's first large-scale electrolyser deployments as part of its $100 million hydrogen deployment round.

In 2024 Andrew Forrest delayed or cancelled plans to manufacture 15 million tonnes of green hydrogen per year by 2030.

The following projects have been cancelled or "Put on hold" Port Pirie, Whyalla, Gladstone and Hunter. Overall 99% of the announced capacity of projects have not progressed beyond the concept or approval stage. "If we look back we probably reached peak hydrogen hype in 2022 with so many projects announced left and right," Rystad analyst Nigel Rambhujun said. "A lot of them have since quietly been abandoned."

As of April 2025 there is only 1 active plant remaining under construction, all other large green hydrogen projects have been abandoned. The remaining project, ABEL, seems to have pivoted to green methanol, not hydrogen.

=== Brazil ===
Brazil's energy matrix is considered one of the cleanest in the world. Experts highlight the country's potential for producing green hydrogen. Research carried out in the country indicates that biomass (such as starches and waste from sewage treatment plants) can be processed and converted into green hydrogen (see: Bioenergy, Biohydrogen and Biological hydrogen production). The Australian company Fortescue Metals Group has plans to install a green hydrogen plant near the port of Pecém, in Ceará, with an initial forecast of starting operations in 2022, but this has been pushed back to 2027-2028 and is contingent on the Final Investment Decision, which will be made by the board in 2026. The final product is likely to be green ammonia. In 2022, the Federal University of Santa Catarina announced a partnership with the German Deutsche Gesellschaft für Internationale Zusammenarbeit, for the production of H2V. Unigel has plans to build a green hydrogen/green ammonia plant in Camaçari, Bahia, which is scheduled to come into operation in 2023. This has not happened as of Q1 2025. Initiatives in this area are also ongoing in the states of Minas Gerais, Paraná, Pernambuco, Piauí, Rio de Janeiro, Rio Grande do Norte, Rio Grande do Sul and São Paulo. Research work by the University of Campinas and the Technical University of Munich has determined the space required for wind and solar parks for large-scale hydrogen production. According to this, significantly less land will be required to produce green hydrogen from wind and photovoltaic energy than is currently required to grow fuel from sugarcane. In this study, author Herzog assumed an electricity requirement for the electrolysers of 120 gigawatts (GW). On 20 November 2023, Ursula von der Leyen, President of the European Commission, announced support for the production of 10 GW of hydrogen and subsequently ammonia in the state of Piauí. Ammonia will be exported from there.

=== Canada ===
World Energy GH2's Project Nujio'qonik aims to be Canada's first commercial green hydrogen / ammonia producer created from three gigawatts of wind energy on the west coast of Newfoundland and Labrador, Canada. Nujio'qonik is the Mi'kmaw name for Bay St. George, where the project is proposed. Since June 2022, the project has been undergoing environmental assessment according to regulatory guidelines issued by the Government of Newfoundland and Labrador. In late 2024 10 projects on the east coast had failed to raise funding, and Prince George on the west coast has been cancelled.

=== Chile ===
Chile's goal to use only clean energy by the year 2050 includes the use of green hydrogen. The EU Latin America and Caribbean Investment Facility provided a €16.5 million grant and the EIB and KfW are in the process of providing up to €100 million each to finance green hydrogen projects.

=== China ===
In 2022 China was the leader of the global hydrogen market with an output of 33 million tons (a third of global production), of which more than 99% is made from fossil fuel, releasing CO_{2}. As of 2021, several companies have formed alliances to increase production of the fuel fifty-fold in the next six years

In 2021 Sinopec aimed to generate 500,000 tonnes of green hydrogen by 2025. This has since been downgraded to 120,000 tonnes. Hydrogen generated from wind energy could provide a cost-effective alternative for coal-dependent regions like Inner Mongolia. As part of preparations for the 2022 Winter Olympics a hydrogen electrolyser, described as the "world's largest" began operations to fuel vehicles used at the games. The electrolyser was powered by onshore wind.

=== Egypt ===
Egypt has opened the door to $40 billion of investment in green hydrogen and renewable technology by signing seven memoranda of understanding with international developers in the fields. The projects located in the Suez canal economic zone will see an investment of around $12 billion at an initial pilot phase, followed by a further $29 billion, according to the country's Planning Minister, Hala Helmy el-Said.

=== Germany ===
Germany invested €9 billion to construct 5 GW of electrolyzer capacity by 2030.

=== India ===
Reliance Industries announced its plan to use about 3 gigawatts (GW) of solar energy to generate 400,000 tonnes of hydrogen. Gautam Adani, founder of the Adani Group announced plans to invest $70 billion to become the world's largest renewable energy company, and produce the cheapest hydrogen across the globe. The power ministry of India has stated that India intends to produce a cumulative 5 million tonnes of green hydrogen by 2030.

In April 2022, the public sector Oil India Limited (OIL), which is headquartered in eastern Assam's Duliajan, set up India's first 99.99% pure green hydrogen pilot plant in keeping with the goal of "making the country ready for the pilot-scale production of hydrogen and its use in various applications" while "research and development efforts are ongoing for a reduction in the cost of production, storage and the transportation" of hydrogen.

In January 2024, subsidies for facilities to produce nearly 412,000 metric tons/year in green hydrogen were awarded. Subsidies for clean hydrogen production are much higher in the US and EU than in India. The discovered price of green hydrogen in India is US$3.9 (INR 328) per kg as of July 2025.

=== Japan ===
In 2023, Japan announced plans to spend US$21 billion on subsidies for delivered clean hydrogen over a 15-year period.

Japan enacted the Hydrogen Society Promotion Act to bridge the cost gap between fossil fuels and clean alternatives through long-term subsidies. Additionally, because of limited domestic renewable energy space, the country is investing heavily in international supply chains to import green hydrogen from partner nations.

=== Lithuania ===
On 5 June 2026 Port of Klaipėda opened Lithuania's first green hydrogen production and supply station. Facility uses a 2.25 MW polymer electrolyte membrane (PEM) electrolyser and is projected to produce approximately 127 tonnes of hydrogen annually at full capacity. The hydrogen is intended to fuel passenger cars and heavy-duty transport, as well as a hydrogen-powered waste-collection vessel and a Toyota Mirai operated by the port authority with further talks to open a second station in capital city of Vilnius.

=== Mauritania ===
Mauritania launched two major projects on green hydrogen. The NOUR Project would become one of the world's largest hydrogen projects with 10 GW of capacity by 2030 in cooperation with Chariot company. The second is the AMAN Project, which includes 12GW of wind capacity and 18GW of solar capacity to produce 1.7 million tons per annum of green hydrogen or 10 million tons per annum of green ammonia for local use and export, in cooperation with Australian company CWP Renewables.

=== Namibia ===
Namibia has commissioned a green hydrogen production project with German support. The 10 billion dollar project involves the construction of wind farms and photovoltaic plants with a total capacity of 7 (GW) to produce. It aims to produce 2 million tonnes of green ammonia and hydrogen derivatives by 2030 and will create 15,000 jobs of which 3,000 will be permanent.

=== Oman ===
An association of companies announced a $30 billion project in Oman, which would become one of the world's largest hydrogen facilities. Construction was to begin in 2028. By 2038 the project was to be powered by 25 GW of wind and solar energy.

=== Portugal ===
In April 2021, Portugal announced plans to construct the first solar-powered plant to produce hydrogen by 2023. Lisbon based energy company Galp Energia announced plans to construct an electrolyser to power its refinery by 2025.

=== Saudi Arabia ===
In 2021, Saudi Arabia, as a part of the NEOM project, announced an investment of $5bn to build a green hydrogen-based ammonia plant, which would start production in 2025.

=== Singapore ===
Singapore started the construction of a 600 MW hydrogen-ready powerplant that is expected to be ready by the first half of 2026. The plant, built on Jurong Island, officially commenced commercial operations to strengthen national energy security. Designed as a combined-cycle gas turbine facility, it is capable of operating on cleaner fuel blends as part of Singapore's broader strategy for hydrogen to potentially meet up to half of its power needs by 2050.

=== Spain ===
In February 2021, thirty companies announced a pioneering project to provide hydrogen bases in Spain. The project intended to supply 93 GW of solar and 67 GW of electrolysis capacity by the end of the decade.

=== Sweden ===
In February 2021, the Swedish company H2 Green Steel (rebranded as Stegra in 2024) announced plans to build a large green hydrogen-based steel plant in Boden, northern Sweden. The project includes a 740 MW electrolyser consisting of 37 alkaline modules of 20 MW each, supplied by thyssenkrupp nucera, making it one of the largest electrolysis installations in Europe. Construction began in 2022, with the first steel structures erected in late 2023.

=== Tunisia ===
In Tunisia, the population is concerned about the green hydrogen plant project in the Gabès region — intended for the European market — for two main reasons: the high water consumption it entails (in a region already experiencing water stress) and the degradation of the landscape.

=== United Arab Emirates ===
In 2021, in collaboration with Expo 2020 Dubai, a pilot project was launched which is the first "industrial scale", solar-driven green hydrogen facility in the Middle East and North Africa."

Building on this foundation, the UAE utilized its position as host of the COP28 summit in Dubai to champion global frameworks for clean energy, joining international declarations aimed at establishing standardized certification schemes and interoperable emission-accounting frameworks for global hydrogen trade. The framework targets a production capacity of 1.4 million tonnes per annum (mtpa) by 2031, comprising 1 mtpa of green hydrogen and 0.4 mtpa of blue hydrogen, with long-term goals scaling up to 15 mtpa by 2050.

=== United Kingdom ===
In August 2017, EMEC, based in Orkney, Scotland, produced hydrogen gas using electricity generated from tidal energy in Orkney. This was the first time that hydrogen had been created from tidal energy anywhere in the world.

In March 2021, a proposal emerged to use offshore wind in Scotland to power converted oil and gas rigs into a "green hydrogen hub" which would supply fuel to local distilleries.

In June 2021, Equinor announced plans to triple UK hydrogen production. In March 2022 National Grid announced a project to introduce green hydrogen into the grid with a 200 m wind turbine powering an electrolyser to produce gas for about 300 homes.

In December 2023, the UK government announced a £2 billion fund would be set up to back 11 separate projects. The then Energy Secretary, Claire Coutinho, announced the funding would be invested over a 15-year period. The first allocation round would be known as HAR1. Vattenfall planned to generate green hydrogen from a test offshore wind turbine near Aberdeen in 2025.

=== United States ===
The federal Infrastructure Investment and Jobs Act, which became law in November 2021, allocated $9.5 billion to green hydrogen initiatives. In 2021, the U.S. Department of Energy (DOE) was planning the first demonstration of a hydrogen network in Texas. The department had previously attempted a hydrogen project known as Hydrogen Energy California, which was terminated in 2016. Texas is considered a key part of green hydrogen projects in the country as the state is the largest domestic producer of hydrogen and has a hydrogen pipeline network. In 2020, SGH2 Energy Global announced plans to use plastic and paper via plasma gasification to produce green hydrogen near Los Angeles.

In 2021 then New York governor Andrew Cuomo announced a $290 million investment to construct a green hydrogen fuel production facility. This was cancelled in October 2024. State authorities backed plans for developing fuel cells to be used in trucks and research on blending hydrogen into the gas grid. In March 2022 the governors of Arkansas, Louisiana, and Oklahoma announced the creation of a hydrogen energy hub between the states. Woodside announced plans for a green hydrogen production site in Ardmore, Oklahoma. Further necessary investment in this facility is being reconsidered by its main investor as of Q1 2025. As of June 2025 this investment is 'on hold'

The Inflation Reduction Act of 2022 established a 10-year production tax credit, which includes a $3.00/kg subsidy for green hydrogen.

=== Uruguay ===
In less than a decade, Uruguay has become one of the world's leading countries in renewable energy generation, achieving more than 98% of its electricity from renewable sources. However, Uruguay still has opportunities for improvement on the demand side of energy use: fossil fuels account for about 40 % of the country's total energy consumption, with the transport and industrial sectors being the main contributors. To achieve a model of economic growth aligned with greenhouse gas (GHG) reduction, the Uruguayan government has introduced a series of measures aimed at further decarbonizing the economy. Among these, electromobility and green hydrogen stand out as key strategies to reduce dependence on oil in these sectors

Given that green hydrogen is one of the main alternatives to decarbonize industry and transport, its global demand is expected to increase rapidly in the coming years. In Uruguay, hydrogen represents an excellent opportunity for several reasons. First, the country has an abundance of renewable energy resources, such as hydropower, wind, solar, and biomass; the latter producing significant quantities of biogenic CO_{2} useful for the production of synthetic fuels. Second, Uruguay has demonstrated a high capacity for adaptation during its first energy transition, as well as strong political stability, both of which are essential to attract investment. Finally, the country possesses a well-developed logistics infrastructure for energy production and export.

As a result, the Uruguayan government has been developing a detailed Green Hydrogen Roadmap, with the goal of positioning Uruguay as a leading producer and exporter of green hydrogen, as well as green fuels and ammonia."

According to a study by the Inter-American Development Bank, Uruguay could produce green hydrogen at a competitive cost of USD 1.2–1.5 per kg H_{2} by 2030. The same study projects annual demand could reach 1.3 million tonnes, driven mainly by the production of Jet fuel, Methanol, and hydrogen for both domestic use and export. Meeting this demand would require the installation of approximately 10 GW of electrolyzers and 20 GW of new renewable capacity, representing an estimated investment of USD 19 billion and the creation of more than 34,000 jobs across the value chain.

==== HIF global ====
HIF Global is a Chilean company that plans to invest approximately USD 6 billion in the production of green hydrogen in Paysandú, Uruguay, marking one of the largest private investments in the country's history. The project aims to produce roughly 180,000 tons of synthetic fuels per year, using around 710,000 tons of CO_{2} captured from existing biomass production, and it will install about 2 GW of renewable photovoltaic and wind capacity and 1 GW of electrolyzers, enabling decarbonisation equivalent to approximately 150,000 vehicles per year.

The water will be extracted from the Uruguay River at a rate of approximately 450 L/s, representing about 0.01 % of the river's total flow. Electricity will be generated at the Lucía Solar Park and Elena Wind Park, as illustrated in Figure 3. The biogenic CO_{2} will be captured from ALUR, the state-owned company focused on producing biofuels and alcohol.

The project has been divided into two phases. Phase 1, scheduled to begin in 2026, aims to construct the electrolyzer facilities along with the required infrastructure for green hydrogen storage and distribution. Phase 2 will focus on building the production plant for e-fuels, and is expected to be completed in 2029.

The total investment is estimated at USD 6 billion, divided into USD 4 billion for the hydrogen and e-fuels production plant and USD 2 billion for the renewable energy park. During the construction phase, the project is expected to employ approximately 3,200 workers across various stages, while around 600 permanent jobs will be created once operations begin.

==== Tambor green hydrogen hub ====
Enertrag is planning to construct a hydrogen hub in Tacuarembó, Uruguay. The project aims to develop a solar photovoltaic plant and wind turbines that will supply electricity to electrolyzers for the production of green hydrogen and its derivatives. With an installed renewable capacity of 350 MW, the facility is expected to produce approximately 16,200 tonnes of green hydrogen per year, all of which will be converted into e-methanol. The project is funded by the H_{2}Global program of the German government, which seeks to accelerate the ramp-up of green hydrogen production in regions such as Latin America and enable Germany to import this renewable energy carrier. One of the main drivers behind this initiative is the need to reduce dependence on fossil fuels, particularly in light of the energy crisis triggered by the war in Ukraine. Through this project, the German government expects to cover about 10% of the methanol currently produced in its largest refinery.

==== Kahiros ====
The Kahirós Project will be the first green hydrogen plant in Uruguay. It will be located in Fray Bentos and is expected to begin operations in 2026, serving as the country's first pilot facility. The project will include a 4.8 MWp photovoltaic solar farm and a 2 MW PEM electrolyzer, capable of producing approximately 77,000 kg of green hydrogen per year. The initiative aims to contribute to the decarbonization of heavy transport. The hydrogen produced will be supplied to Montes del Plata, a pulp-mill company, to power six hydrogen fuel-cell trucks, each with a range of 700 km and a refueling time of 12 minutes. The facility will consume around 4,200 L of water per day and is expected to achieve a CO_{2} abatement of 870 tonnes per year.

In terms of technology, the solar farm will use bifacial solar cells, which provide higher energy conversion efficiency. The 2 MW electrolyzer is designed to produce up to 46 kg of hydrogen per hour at a working pressure of 30 bar. The hydrogen will then be compressed to 700 bar for vehicle refueling. The trucks used in this pilot project will be Hyundai hydrogen fuel-cell models.

==== Pilot H24U ====
Like the Kahirós Project, the H24U pilot is a three-year green hydrogen initiative that aims to decarbonize heavy cargo transportation in Uruguay, a sector that currently accounts for 28% of the country's total energy demand. The pilot is a multi-company initiative funded by the Green Hydrogen Sectorial Fund of the Ministry of Industry, Energy and Mining (Uruguay). The plan is to incorporate 17 retrofitted fuel-cell trucks for the forestry sector. Hydrogen production will be carried out by a 5 MW electrolyzer plant located in Durazno, Uruguay, powered by a 10 MW solar farm. In addition, the project aims to evaluate the feasibility of injecting hydrogen (H_{2}) into existing methane (CH_{4}) pipelines, with the goal of reducing the carbon footprint of natural gas distribution.

=== Public-private projects ===
In October 2023, Siemens announced that it had successfully performed the first test of an industrial turbine powered by 100 per cent green hydrogen generated by a 1 megawatt electrolyser. The turbine also operates on gas and any mixture of gas and hydrogen.

== Government support ==
In 2020, the European Commission adopted a dedicated strategy on hydrogen. The "European Green Hydrogen Acceleration Center" is tasked with developing a €100 billion a year green hydrogen economy by 2025.

In December 2020, the United Nations together with RMI and several companies, launched Green Hydrogen Catapult, with a goal to reduce the cost of green hydrogen below US$2 per kilogram (equivalent to $50 per megawatt hour) by 2026.

In 2021, with the support of the governments of Austria, China, Germany, and Italy, UN Industrial Development Organization (UNIDO) launched its Global Programme for Hydrogen in Industry. Its goal is to accelerate the deployment of GH2 in industry.

In 2021, the British government published its policy document, a "Ten Point Plan for a Green Industrial Revolution," which included investing to create 5 GW of low carbon hydrogen by 2030. The plan included working with industry to complete the necessary testing that would allow up to 20% blending of hydrogen into the gas distribution grid by 2023. A BEIS consultation in 2022 suggested that grid blending would only have a "limited and temporary" role due to an expected reduction in the use of natural gas.

The Japanese government planned to transform the nation into a "hydrogen society". Energy demand would require the government to import/produce 36 million tons of liquefied hydrogen. At the time Japan's commercial imports were projected to be 100 times less than this amount by 2030, when the use of fuel was expected to commence. Japan published a preliminary road map that called for hydrogen and related fuels to supply 10% of the power for electricity generation as well as a significant portion of the energy for uses such as shipping and steel manufacture by 2050. Japan created a hydrogen highway consisting of 135 subsidized hydrogen fuels stations and planned to construct 1,000 by the end of the 2020s.

In October 2020, the South Korean government announced its plan to introduce the Clean Hydrogen Energy Portfolio Standards (CHPS) which emphasizes the use of clean hydrogen. During the introduction of the Hydrogen Energy Portfolio Standard (HPS), it was voted on by the 2nd Hydrogen Economy Committee. In March 2021, the 3rd Hydrogen Economy Committee was held to pass a plan to introduce a clean hydrogen certification system based on incentives and obligations for clean hydrogen.

Morocco, Tunisia, Egypt and Namibia have proposed plans to include green hydrogen as a part of their climate change agenda. Namibia is partnering with European countries such as Netherlands and Germany for feasibility studies and funding.

In July 2020, the European Union unveiled the Hydrogen Strategy for a Climate-Neutral Europe. A motion backing this strategy passed the European Parliament in 2021. The plan is divided into three phases. From 2020 to 2024, the program aims to decarbonize existing hydrogen production. From 2024-2030 green hydrogen would be integrated into the energy system. From 2030 to 2050 large-scale deployment of hydrogen would occur. Goldman Sachs estimated hydrogen to 15% of the EU energy mix by 2050.

Six European Union member states: Germany, Austria, France, the Netherlands, Belgium and Luxembourg, requested hydrogen funding be backed by legislation. Many member countries have created plans to import hydrogen from other nations, especially from North Africa. These plans would increase hydrogen production, but were accused of trying to export the necessary changes needed within Europe. The European Union required that starting in 2021, all new gas turbines made in the bloc must be ready to burn a hydrogen–natural gas blend.

In November 2020, Chile's president presented the "National Strategy for Green Hydrogen," stating he wanted Chile to become "the most efficient green hydrogen producer in the world by 2030". The plan includes HyEx, a project to make solar based hydrogen for use in the mining industry.

The Swiss government (Federal Council) adopted a hydrogen strategy in November 2024. It does not provide for financial support.

== Regulations and standards ==
In the European Union, certified 'renewable' hydrogen, defined as produced from non-biological feedstocks, requires an emission reduction of at least 70% below the fossil fuel it is intended to replace. This is distinct in the EU from 'low carbon' hydrogen, which is defined as made using fossil fuel feedstocks. For it to be certified, low carbon hydrogen must achieve at least a 70% reduction in emissions compared with the grey hydrogen it replaces.

In the United Kingdom, just one standard is proposed, for 'low carbon' hydrogen. Its threshold GHG emissions intensity of 20gCO_{2} equivalent per megajoule should be easily met by renewably-powered electrolysis of water for green hydrogen production, but has been set at a level to allow for and encourage other 'low carbon' hydrogen production, principally blue hydrogen. Blue hydrogen is grey hydrogen with added carbon capture and storage, which to date has not been produced with carbon capture rates in excess of 60%. To meet the UK's threshold, its government has estimated that an 85% carbon capture rate would be necessary.

In the United States, planned tax credit incentives for green hydrogen production are to be tied to the emissions intensity of 'clean' hydrogen produced, with greater levels of support on offer for lower greenhouse gas intensities.

== See also ==
- Alternative fuel
- Carbon-neutral fuel
- Combined cycle hydrogen power plant
- Fossil fuel phase-out
- Hydrogen economy
- Green methanol fuel
