= Triple phase boundary =

A triple phase boundary (TPB) is a geometrical class of phase boundary and the location of contact between three different phases. A simple example of a TPB is a coastline where land, air and sea meet to create an energetic location driven by solar, wind and wave energy capable of supporting a high level of biodiversity. This concept is particularly important in the description of electrodes in fuel cells and batteries. For example for fuel cells, the three phases are an ion conductor (electrolyte), an electron conductor, and a virtual "porosity" phase for transporting gaseous or liquid fuel molecules. The electrochemical reactions that fuel cells use to produce electricity occur in the presence of these three phases. Triple phase boundaries are thus the electrochemically active sites within electrodes.

The oxygen reduction reaction that occurs at a solid oxide fuel cell's (SOFC) cathode, can be written as follows:

O_{2}(gas) + 4e^{−}(electrode) → 2O^{2−}(electrolyte)

Different mechanisms bring these reactants to a TPB to carry out this reaction. The kinetics of this reaction is one of the limiting factors in cell performance, so increasing the TPB density will increase the reaction rate, and thus increase cell performance. Analogously, TPB density will also influence the kinetics of the oxidation reaction that occurs between oxygen ions and fuel on the anode side of the cell. Transport to and from each TPB will also affect kinetics, so optimization of the pathways to get reactants and products to the active area is also an important consideration. Researchers working with fuel cells are increasingly using 3D imaging techniques like FIB-SEM and X-ray nanotomogrpahy to measure TPB density as a way of characterizing cell activity. Recently, processing techniques such as infiltration have been shown to substantially increase TPB density, leading to higher efficiency and, potentially, more commercially viable SOFCs.

== Units ==
In systems consisting of only three phases, triple phase boundaries are geometrically closed loop linear features that do not intersect other TPBs and do not as such form a network. The simplest TPB shape is easily visualised using two arbitrarily sized intersecting spheres of different phase suspended in free space (see figure 3) which creates a circular TPB at the intersection of the spheres. However, in electrodes TPB loops typically have highly complex and stochastic shapes in three dimensions (3D). TPBs thus have the units of length. For electrodes normalising the TPB length to TPB density provides an important microstructure parameter for the description of electrode and thus cell performance that is independent of electrode dimensions. TPB density is normally a volumetric density and is measured in units of inverse square length, typically μm^{−2} (i.e. μm/μm^{3}) due to the scale of typical electrode microstructural features.

== Active TPB ==
Triple phase boundaries are only electrochemically active if each and every "phase" is connected to reaction species sources and destinations to complete the electrochemical reaction. Active TPBs are often referred to as percolated TPBs. For example in an SOFC Ni-YSZ anode cermet the TPB must:

- Have access to hydrogen from the anode gas inlet and be able to exhaust steam to the anode gas outlet via the pore phase network
- Have access to oxygen ions transported from the electrolyte YSZ electrolyte phase network
- Be able to conduct electrons from the TPB through the electron conducting nickel network to the anode current collector

In addition to increasing the TPB density it is obviously advantageous to increase the ratio of active to total TPB density to increase electrode/cell performance electrode.

== See also ==
- Glossary of fuel cell terms
