= Gadolinium-doped ceria =

Ceramic electrolyte

Gadolinium-doped ceria (GDC) (known alternatively as gadolinia-doped ceria, gadolinium-doped cerium oxide (GCO), cerium-gadolinium oxide (CGO), or cerium(IV) oxide, gadolinium-doped, formula Gd:CeO_{2}) is a ceramic electrolyte used in solid oxide fuel cells (SOFCs). It has a cubic structure and a density of around 7.2 g/cm^{3} in its oxidised form. It is one of a class of ceria-doped electrolytes with higher ionic conductivity and lower operating temperatures (<700 °C) than those of yttria-stabilized zirconia, the material most commonly used in SOFCs. Because YSZ requires operating temperatures of 800–1000 °C to achieve maximal ionic conductivity, the associated energy and costs make GDC an optimal (even "irreplaceable", according to researchers from the Fraunhofer Society) material for commercially viable SOFCs.

== Structure and properties ==
Oxygen vacancies are created when gadolinium (a trivalent cation) is introduced into ceria (CeO_{2}, with Ce in the +4 oxidation state) or on reduction in CO or H_{2}. The high concentration and mobility of the oxide ion vacancies results in a high ionic conductivity in this material. In addition to its high ionic conductivity GDC is an attractive alternative to YSZ as an electrolyte due to low reactivity and good chemical compatibility with many mixed conducting cathode materials. Dopant levels of Gd typically range from 10% to 20%. The majority of SOFC researchers and manufacturers still favor the use of YSZ over CGO due to YSZ having superior strength and because GDC will reduce at high temperature when exposed to H_{2} or CO.

== Synthesis ==
Methods of synthesis have included precipitation, hydrothermal treatment, sol-gel, spray pyrolysis technique (SPT), combustion and nanocasting using cerium sources such as cerium nitrate, ceric ammonium nitrate, cerium oxalate, cerium carbonate and cerium hydroxide. GDC has been synthesized in such forms as powder, ink, discs, and nanomaterials (including nanoparticle, nanocrystals, nanopowder, and nanowires).

== Applications ==
Aside from SOFCs, GDC has other uses:

- As an oxygen sensor
- In catalytic treatment of automobile exhaust fumes

== See also ==
- Cerium(IV) oxide
- Solid oxide fuel cell
