= Lanthanum cobaltite =

Names
- Other names Lanthanum cobalt oxide

Identifiers
CAS Number	12016-86-3
3D model (JSmol)	Interactive image
ECHA InfoCard	100.234.921
EC Number	807-340-6
PubChem CID	167713694
- InChI: InChI=1S/Co.La.3O/q2*+3;3*-2 Key: YPEZFFYJJVDWJO-UHFFFAOYSA-N
- SMILES: [Co+3].[La+3].[O-2].[O-2].[O-2]

Properties
Chemical formula	CoLaO_{3}
Molar mass	245.836 g·mol^{−1}

Hazards
- GHS labelling
Pictograms	(GHS07: Exclamation mark) (GHS08: Health hazard)
Signal word	Warning
Hazard statements	H302, H317, H319, H335, H351
Precautionary statements	P201, P202, P261, P264, P271, P272, P280, P302+P352, P304+P340, P305+P351+P338, P308+P313, P321, P333+P313, P337+P313, P362, P403+P233, P405, P501
- Except where otherwise noted, data are given for materials in their standard state (at 25 °C [77 °F], 100 kPa). Infobox references

Lanthanum cobaltite is a perovskite with chemical formula LaCoO_{3}. As a solid, the structure LaCoO_{3}, will exist as rhombohedral material at room temperature with ferroelastic properties; though at temperatures above ~900 °C a phase transition to a cubic lattice occurs.

It is also common of LaCoO_{3} to be utilized with either dopants or exhibit oxygen non-stoichometry where it may assume the structure La_{1−x}A'_{x}Co_{1−y}B'_{y}O_{3±𝛿} where 𝛿 is some small quantity making this class of perovskites extremely versatile for catalysis, one such commonly utilized material is lanthanum strontium cobalt ferrite otherwise known as LSCF.
