= Bloom Energy Server =

Solid oxide fuel cell power generator made by Bloom Energy

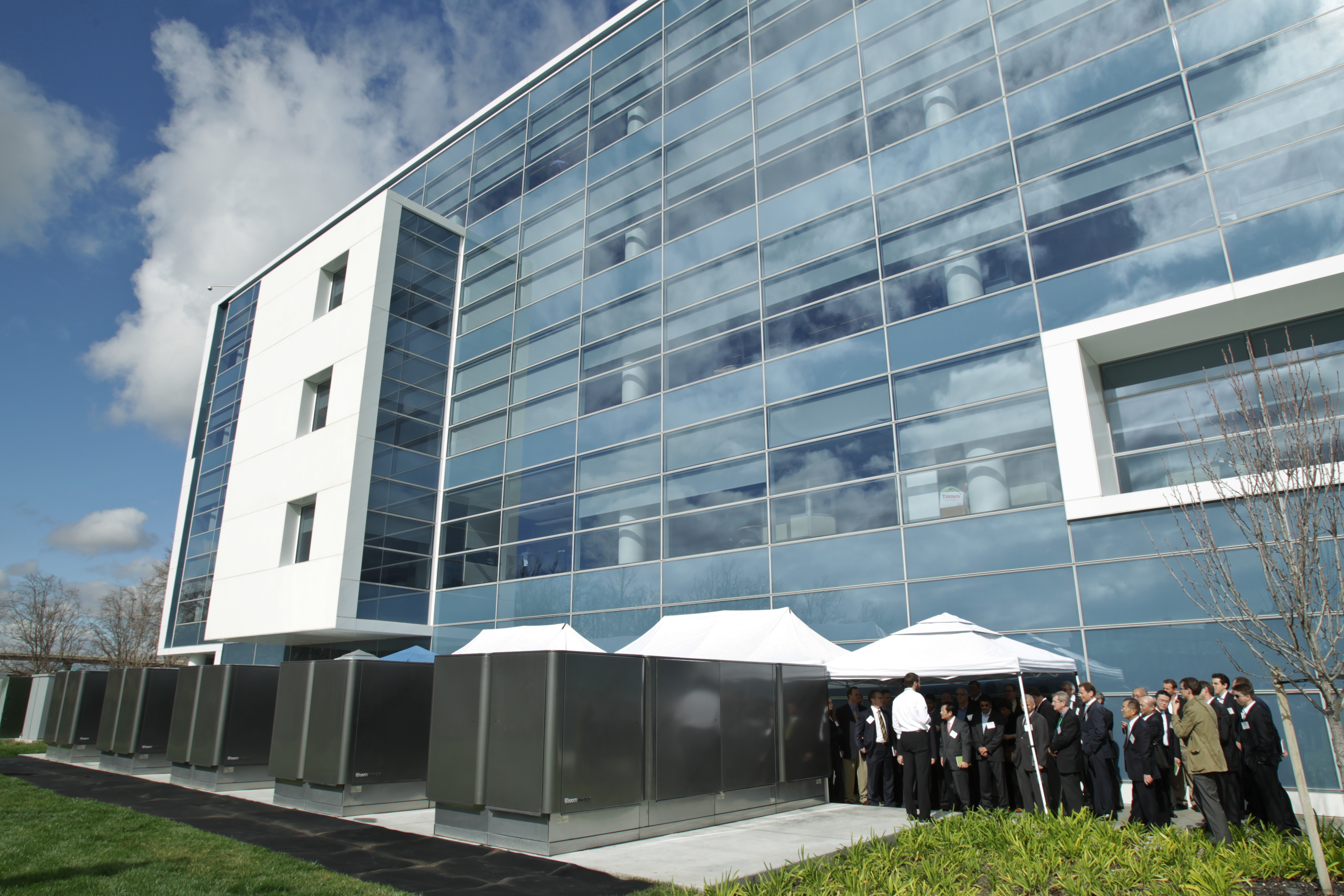
A deployment of Bloom Energy Servers outside eBay headquarters

The Bloom Energy Server or Bloom Box is a solid oxide fuel cell (SOFC) made by Bloom Energy, of Sunnyvale, California, that produces electricity directly from natural gas or other liquid or gaseous hydrocarbons at or near the site where it will be used. According to the company, a single cell (one 100 mm × 100 mm plate consisting of three ceramic layers) generates 25 watts.

The cell's technology relies on non-renewable sources of energy, and because it is not a hydrogen fuel cell, it produces carbon dioxide (an important greenhouse gas) during operation. As the carbon dioxide effluent from the anode is not mixed with the oxygen depleted air coming off the cathode, only water and unconsumed fuel, it can be separated for sequestration or other non-atmospheric disposition by simply cooling the exhaust stream.

== Technology ==
The Bloom Energy Server uses thin white ceramic plates of size 100 × 100 mm. Each plate is coated with a green nickel oxide-based ink on one side, forming the anode, and another black (probably Lanthanum strontium manganite) ink on the cathode side. Wired reported that the secret ingredient may be yttria-stabilized zirconia based upon US patent 7572530 that was granted to Bloom in 2009; this material is also one of the most common electrolyte materials in the field. US patent application 20080261099, assigned to Bloom Energy Corporation, says that the "electrolyte includes yttria stabilized zirconia and a scandia-stabilized zirconia, such as a scandia ceria stabilized zirconia". ScSZ has a higher conductivity than YSZ at lower temperatures, which provides greater efficiency and higher reliability when used as an electrolyte. Scandia is scandium oxide (Sc_{2}O_{3}) which is a transition metal oxide.

To save money, the Bloom Energy Server uses inexpensive metal alloy plates for electric conductance between the two ceramic fast ion conductor plates. In competing lower temperature fuel cells, platinum is required at the cathode.

== Costs ==
=== Installation ===
The current cost of each hand-made 100 kW Bloom Energy Server is $700,000–800,000. In 2010, the company announced plans for a smaller, home sized Bloom server priced under $3,000. Bloom estimated the size of a home-sized server at 1 kW, although others recommended 5 kW. The capital cost is $7–8 per watt.

According to The New York Times (Green Blog), in early 2011 "... Bloom Energy ... unveiled a service to allow customers to buy the electricity generated by its fuel cells without incurring the capital costs of purchasing the six-figure devices.... Under the Bloom Electrons service, customers sign 10-year contracts to purchase the electricity generated by Bloom Energy Servers while the company retains ownership of the fuel cells and responsibility for their maintenance.... 'We’re able to tell customers, ‘You don’t have to put any money up front, you pay only for the electrons you use and it’s good for your pocketbook and good for planet,’ ' [CEO K.R. Sridhar] said."

=== Usage ===
On 24 February 2010, Sridhar claimed that his devices were making electricity for $0.08–.10/kWh using natural gas, cheaper than electricity prices in some parts of the United States, such as California. Twenty percent of the cost savings depend upon avoiding transfer losses that result from energy grid use.

In 2010, Bloom Energy claimed to be developing power purchase agreements to sell electricity produced by the boxes, rather than selling the boxes themselves, in order to address customers' fears about box maintenance, reliability, and servicing costs. There are 123 Bloom boxes producing at 16 cents/kWh for Delmarva Power in a 21-year deal going from 2012 to 2033.

As of 2010, 15% of the power consumed by eBay was generated via the use of Bloom Energy Servers. At the time, after factoring in tax incentives which effectively halved the initial cost, eBay expected a three-year payback period based on the then $0.14/kWh cost of commercial electricity in California.

As of 2013 electricity produced by fuel cells costs about $0.15 per kilowatt-hour. In comparison, coal-generated power costs $0.07–$0.15, and natural-gas power costs $0.06–$0.09.

== Installations ==
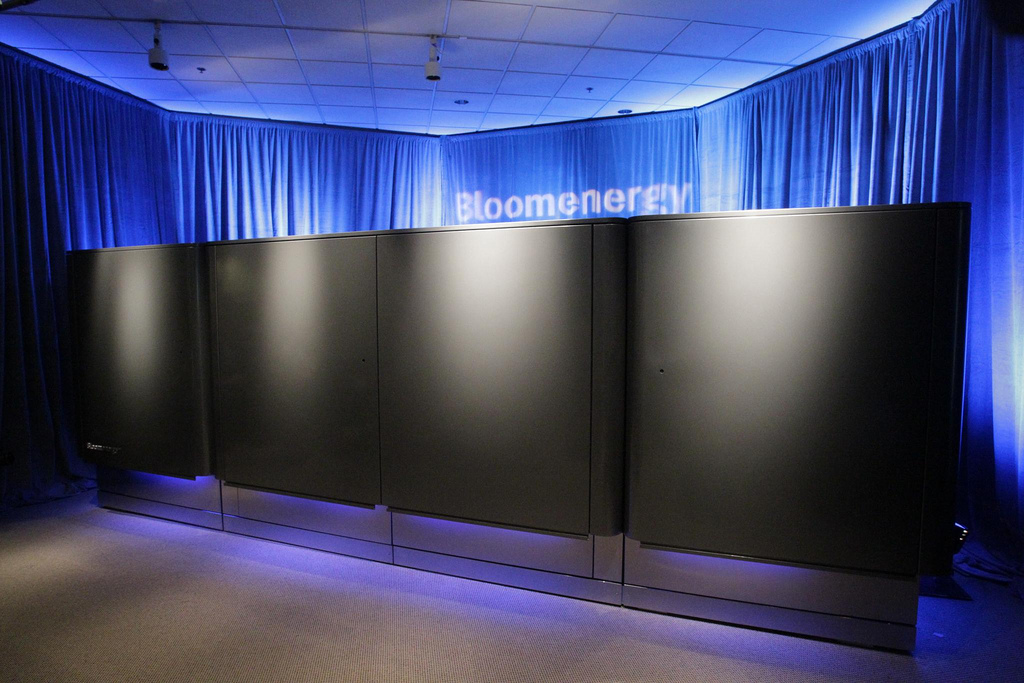
A small deployment of Bloom Energy Servers in 2010

The company says that its first 100-kW Bloom Energy Servers were shipped to Google in July 2008. Four such servers were installed at Google's headquarters, which became Bloom Energy's first customer. Another installation of five boxes produces up to 500 kW at eBay headquarters California. Bloom Energy stated that their customers include Staples (300 kW – December 2008), Walmart (800 kW – January 2010), FedEx (500 kW), The Coca-Cola Company (500 kW) and Bank of America (500 kW). Each of these installations were located in California.

A 1-megawatt Bloom Box fuel cell system installed at Yahoo headquarters in Sunnyvale, California in 2014 is designed to "power one-third of the electricity to the buildings on Yahoo’s campus."

Stop & Shop Supermarket Company announced a 250 kW system in 2015, and 2020 announced plans to configure 40 MA and NY stores to "microgrids" using Bloom Energy Servers.

== Portable units ==
Sridhar announced plans to install Bloom Energy Servers in third world nations. Ex-Chairman of the Joint Chiefs of Staff, Colin Powell, now a Bloom Energy board member, said the Bloom Energy generators could be useful to the military because they are lighter, more efficient, and generate less heat than traditional generators.

== Feasibility ==
$CH_4 + 2O_2 \rightarrow CO_2 + 2H_2O + electricity + heat$

— The chemical reaction used to create energy in Bloom Energy products

Bloom Energy Servers stack small fuel cells to operate in concert. Bloom Energy's approach of assembling fuel-cell stacks that enables individual plates to expand and contract at the same rate at high temperatures. However, other solid oxide fuel cell producers have solved the problem of different expansion rates of cells in the past. Scott Samuelsen of the University of California, Irvine National Fuel Cell Research Center questioned the operational life of Bloom Servers. "At this point, Bloom has excellent potential, but they have yet to demonstrate that they've met the bars of reliability." Lawrence Berkeley National Laboratory expert Michael Tucker claimed, "Because they operate at high temperatures, they can accept other fuels like natural gas and methane, and that's an enormous advantage... The disadvantage is that they can shatter as they are heating or cooling."

Venture capitalist John Doerr asserted that the Bloom Energy Server is cheaper and cleaner than the grid. An expert at Gerson Lehrman Group wrote that, given today's electricity transmission losses of about 7% and utility-size gas-fired power stations efficiency of 33–48%, the Bloom Energy Server is up to twice as efficient as a gas-fired power station. Fortune stated that "Bloom has still not released numbers about how much the Bloom Box costs to operate per kilowatt hour" and estimates that natural gas rather than bio-gas will be its primary fuel source. AP reporter Jonathan Fahey in Forbes wrote: "Are we really falling for this again? Every clean tech company on the planet says it can produce clean energy cheaply, yet not a single one can. Government subsidies or mandates keep the entire worldwide industry afloat. Hand it to Bloom, the company has managed to tap into the hype machine like no other clean tech company in memory."

=== Efficiency ===
Bloom claims a conversion efficiency of around 50%, or up to 65% when new. A modern combined cycle gas turbine power plant (CCGT) can reach 60% overall efficiency, while cogeneration (electricity and district heating) can achieve greater than 95% efficiency. Sridhar stated that Bloom's products convert chemical energy to electrical energy in one step, are more fuel efficient than current gas-fired power stations and reduce transmission/distribution losses by producing power where it is used.

Each Bloom Energy Server ES5700 is said to provide 200 kW of power, similar to the baseload needs of 160 average homes or one office building. The average monthly electricity consumption for a U.S. residential utility customer in 2012 was 903 kWh per month (or 1.24 kW mean load).

Sridhar said the boxes have a 10-year life span, although that could include replacing the cells during that period. The CEO of eBay says Bloom Energy Servers have saved the company $100,000 in electricity bills since they were installed in mid-2009, Fortune Magazine contributor Paul Keegan calls that figure "meaningless without the details to see how he got there".

The largest disadvantage is the high operating temperature which results in longer start-up times and mechanical and chemical compatibility issues.

== Competition ==
FuelCell Energy manufactures molten carbonate fuel cell (MCFC) power plants both for sale and for Power purchase agreement use, and has been demonstrating solid oxide based power plants and electrolyzers, though (as of October 2025) none of the latter have been sold commercially yet.

Sprint owns 15 patents on hydrogen fuel cells and is using 250 fuel cells to provide backup power for its operations. Sprint has been using fuel cell power since 2005. In 2009, Sprint's fuel cell program received a grant of $7.3 million from the United States Department of Energy to expand the hydrogen capacity of its fuel cell tanks from providing up to 15 hours of backup power, to 72 hours. Sprint partnered with ReliOn and Altergy for fuel cell manufacture, and with Air Products and Chemicals as a hydrogen supplier. German fuel cell firm P21 has been working on similar projects to supply backup power for cellular operations.

In October 2009, the Department of Energy awarded nearly US$25 million in grants for research and development of solar fuels.

In October 2012, the US government awarded Bloom Energy $70,710,959 under its section 1603 energy awards program.

A competitor claimed the Bloom Box uses a "thick electrolyte" that requires 900 °C temperatures to overcome electrical resistance. Topsoe Fuel Cell and Ceres Power instead employ "thick anode" technology that allows operation at cooler temperature. Ceres has a four-year program to install 37,500 units in the homes of customers of the UK's British Gas.

Ballard Power's comparably scaled products are based on proton exchange membrane fuel cells. Ballard's 150 kW units are intended for mobile applications such as municipal buses, while their larger 1 MW stationary systems are configured from banks of 11 kW building blocks.

Another competitor in Europe and Australia is Ceramic Fuel Cells. It claims an efficiency of 60% for the power-only units; these fuel cells are based on technology spun off from Australia's CSIRO.

== See also ==
- Home fuel cell
