= Hala Helmy el-Said =

Egyptian politician (born 1957)

- هالة حلمي السعيد
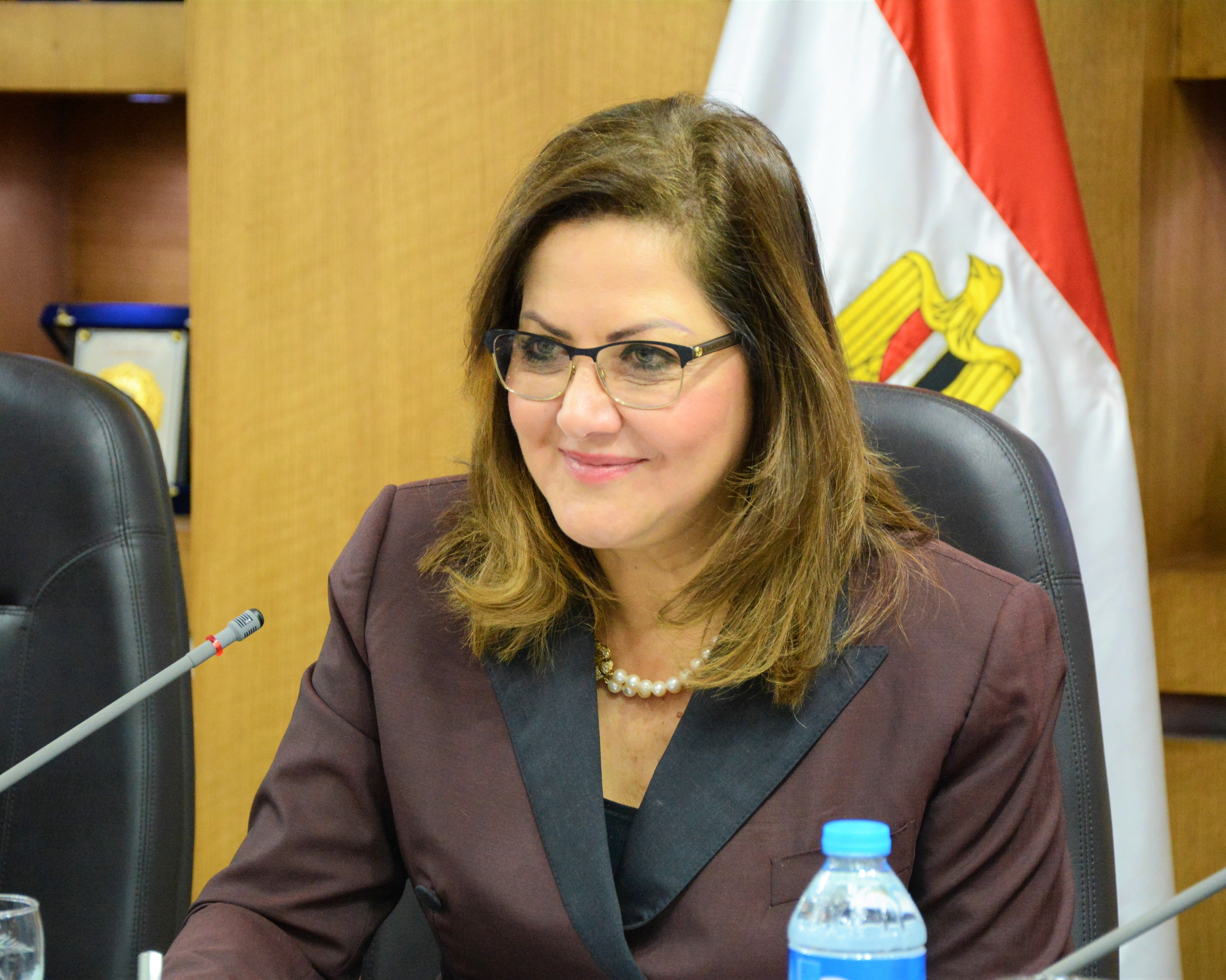

Minister of Planning and Economic Development
- In office 22 December 2019 – 3 July 2024
- President: Abdel Fattah el-Sisi
- Prime Minister: Sherif Ismail, Mostafa Madbouly

Personal details
- Born: 19 May 1957 (age 69) Cairo, Egypt
- Education: Cairo University

Hala Helmy el-Said (Arabic: هالة حلمي السعيد; born 19 May 1957) is the Economic Advisor to H.E. President Abdel Fattah el-Sisi and Former Egyptian Minister of Planning and Economic Development.

== Early life and career ==
Hala was born in Cairo in 1957. She is the first elected dean of the Faculty of Economics and Political Science from 2011 to 2016 at Cairo University. She also held the position of Assistant President of Cairo University for Scientific Research Affairs and External Relations from September 2013 to 2016.

== Qualifications ==
Hala holds the following degrees:

- Doctor of Philosophy in Economics from the Faculty of Economics and Political Science from Cairo University - in 1989
- Master's degree in economics with excellent grades from the faculty of economics and political sciences from Cairo University - in 1983
