= Ceramic Fuel Cells =

- Type: Private
- Industry: Alternative energy
- Founded: 1992
- Headquarters: Melbourne, Australia
- Key people: Alasdair Locke Chairman; Robert Kennett Managing Director
- Products: Fuel cells
- Number of employees: 150

Ceramic Fuel Cells Ltd (ASX: CFU) was an Australian fuel cell technology company, based in Melbourne. The company produced the "BlueGen" gas-to-electricity generators. CFCL's developed solid oxide fuel cell (SOFC) technology to provide reliable, energy efficient, high quality, and low-emission electricity from natural gas and renewable fuels. CFCL was developing SOFC products for small-scale on-site micro combined heat and power (m-CHP) and distributed generation units that co-generate electricity and heat for domestic use. On 1 March 2015 it was announced that the company had appointed voluntary administrators.

Company De-Listed In accordance with section 3.4 of ASX Listing Rules "Guidance Note 33 Removal of Entities from the ASX Official List", Ceramic Fuel Cells Ltd was removed from the official list by the ASX under listing rule 17.12 from the commencement of trading on Monday 5 March 2018.

== History ==
Ceramic Fuel Cells Ltd was formed in 1992 by the Commonwealth Scientific and Industrial Research Organisation (CSIRO) and a consortium of energy and industrial companies. In 2009 a production facility opened in Noble Park, Melbourne and another one in Heinsberg, Germany, which won the North Rhine-Westphalia's economic development agency NRW.INVEST award for innovation.

== Products ==
The first marketed product of the company is "BlueGen" a solid oxide fuel cell which creates electricity and heat by passing natural gas over ceramic fuel cells. BlueGen is 85% efficient and is reported to cut the average Australian home's annual carbon dioxide emissions by 18 tonnes.

== Partners ==
CFCL has signed agreements with leading European utility customers and appliance partners in Europe and Japan to deploy micro-CHP units using CFCL's SOFC technology. These agreements give the Company access to a number of large and advanced European markets for m-CHP units. The company's utility partners in these markets have a total of more than 20 million gas and electricity customers.
