= NRW.INVEST =

Economic development agency of North Rhine-Westphalia

NRW.INVEST is the economic development agency of the German State of North Rhine-Westphalia (NRW). It deals with the acquisition of and support for foreign investors and the international marketing for NRW as a business location. As One-Stop-Agency for foreign investors, NRW.INVEST supports mainly international companies with their investment projects and settlements in NRW throughout the entire settlement process. NRW.INVEST maintains two subsidiaries in Japan and the United States as well as thirteen representative offices in China, India, Israel, South Korea, Poland, Russia, Turkey and the United Kingdom. The sole shareholder of NRW.INVEST is the state of North Rhine-Westphalia.

In 2010 the state economic development agency NRW.INVEST celebrated its 50th anniversary. When it was founded in 1960, the former “Rheinisch-Westfälische Industrieförderungsgesellschaft” was commissioned by the state of North Rhine-Westphalia to recruit new industries to succeed the crisis-stricken mining industry.

The logo of the economic development agency NRW.INVEST
