= Lanthanum strontium cobalt ferrite =

Lanthanum strontium cobalt ferrite (LSCF), also called lanthanum strontium cobaltite ferrite is a specific ceramic oxide derived from lanthanum cobaltite of the ferrite group. It is a phase containing lanthanum(III) oxide, strontium oxide, cobalt oxide and iron oxide with the formula La_{x}Sr_{1−x}Co_{y}Fe_{1−y}O_{3}, where 0.1≤x≤0.4 and 0.2≤y≤0.8.

It is black in color and crystallizes in a distorted hexagonal perovskite structure. LSCF undergoes phase transformations at various temperatures depending on the composition. This material is a mixed ionic electronic conductor with comparatively high electronic conductivity (200+ S/cm) and good ionic conductivity (0.2 S/cm). It is typically non-stoichiometric and can be reduced further at high temperature in low oxygen partial pressures or in the presence of a reducing agent such as carbon.

LSCF is being investigated as a material for intermediate temperature solid oxide fuel cell cathodes and, potentially as a direct carbon fuel cell anode.

LSCF is also investigated as a membrane material for separation of oxygen from air, for use in e.g. cleaner burning power plants.

== See also ==
- Lanthanum strontium manganite (LSM)
- Lanthanum strontium ferrite (LSF)
- Lanthanum calcium manganite (LCM)
- Lanthanum strontium chromite (LSC)
- Lanthanum strontium gallate magnesite (LSGM)
