= Solid oxide fuel cell =

Fuel cell that produces electricity by oxidization

Scheme of a hydrogen-oxygen gas fuel cell

A solid oxide fuel cell (or SOFC) is an electrochemical conversion device that produces electricity directly from oxidizing a fuel. Fuel cells are characterized by their electrolyte material; the SOFC has a solid oxide or ceramic electrolyte.

Advantages of this class of fuel cells include high combined heat and power efficiency, long-term stability, fuel flexibility, low emissions, and relatively low cost. The largest disadvantage is the high operating temperature, which results in longer start-up times and mechanical and chemical compatibility issues.

== Introduction ==
Solid oxide fuel cells are a class of fuel cells characterized by using a solid oxide material as the electrolyte. SOFCs use a solid oxide electrolyte to conduct negative oxygen ions from the cathode to the anode. The electrochemical oxidation of the hydrogen, carbon monoxide or other organic intermediates by oxygen ions thus occurs on the anode side. More recently, proton-conducting SOFCs (PC-SOFC) have been developed to transport protons instead of oxygen ions through the electrolyte with the advantage of running at lower temperatures than traditional SOFCs.

They operate at very high temperatures, typically between 600 and 1,000 °C. At these temperatures, SOFCs do not require expensive platinum group metals catalysts, as is currently necessary for lower temperature fuel cells such as PEMFCs, and are not vulnerable to carbon monoxide catalyst poisoning. However, vulnerability to sulfur poisoning has been widely observed, and the sulfur must be removed before entering the cell. For lower-quality fuels, such as gasified biomass, coal, or biogas, fuel processing becomes increasingly complex and, consequently, more expensive. The gasification process, which transforms the raw material into a gaseous state suitable for fuel cells, can generate significant quantities of compounds like methane and toluene, as well as larger polyaromatic and short-chain hydrocarbon compounds. These substances can lead to carbon buildup in SOFCs. The expenses associated with reforming and desulfurization are comparable in magnitude to the cost of the fuel cell itself. These factors become especially critical for systems with lower power output or greater portability requirements.

Solid oxide fuel cells have a wide variety of applications, from using them as auxiliary power units in vehicles to stationary power generation with outputs from 100 W to 2 MW. A proposed maritime application is a 300 kW SOFC auxiliary generator on a 174,000 m³ LNG carrier planned by Mitsui O.S.K. Lines (MOL) and Samsung Heavy Industries (SHI). In 2009, the Australian company, Ceramic Fuel Cells, successfully achieved an efficiency of an SOFC device up to the previously theoretical mark of 60%. The higher operating temperature makes SOFCs suitable for application with heat engine energy recovery devices or combined heat and power, further increasing overall fuel efficiency.

Because of these high temperatures, light hydrocarbon fuels, such as methane, propane, and butane, can be internally reformed within the anode. SOFCs can also be fueled by externally reforming heavier hydrocarbons, such as gasoline, diesel, jet fuel (JP-8) or biofuels. Such reformates are mixtures of hydrogen, carbon monoxide, carbon dioxide, steam and methane, formed by reacting the hydrocarbon fuels with air or steam in a device upstream of the SOFC anode. SOFC power systems can increase efficiency by using the heat from the exothermic electrochemical oxidation within the fuel cell for an endothermic steam reforming process. Solid fuels, such as coal and biomass, may also be gasified to form syngas suitable for fueling SOFCs in integrated gasification fuel cell power cycles.

Thermal expansion demands a uniform and well-regulated heating process at startup. SOFC stacks with planar geometry require an hour to heat to operating temperature. Micro-tubular fuel cell design geometries promise much faster start-up times, typically in the order of minutes.

Unlike most other types of fuel cells, SOFCs can have multiple geometries. The planar fuel cell design geometry is the typical sandwich-type geometry employed by most types of fuel cells, where the electrolyte is sandwiched between the electrodes. SOFCs can also be made in tubular geometries where either air or fuel is passed through the inside of the tube, and the other gas is passed along the outside of the tube. The tubular design is advantageous because it is much easier to seal air from the fuel. The performance of the planar design is currently better than the performance of the tubular design, however, because the planar design has a lower resistance comparatively. Other geometries of SOFCs include modified planar fuel cell designs (MPC or MPSOFC), where a wave-like structure replaces the traditional flat configuration of the planar cell. Such designs are highly promising because they share the advantages of both planar cells (low resistance) and tubular cells.

== Operation ==
Cross section of three ceramic layers of a tubular SOFC. From inner to outer: porous cathode, dense electrolyte, porous anode

A solid oxide fuel cell is made up of four layers, three of which are ceramics (hence the name). A single cell consisting of these four layers stacked together is typically only a few millimeters thick. Hundreds of these cells are then connected in series to form what most people refer to as an "SOFC stack". The ceramics used in SOFCs do not become electrically and ionically active until they reach very high temperatures. As a consequence, the stacks have to run at temperatures ranging from 500 to 1,000 °C. Reduction of oxygen into oxygen ions occurs at the cathode. These ions can then diffuse through the solid oxide electrolyte to the anode where they can electrochemically oxidize the fuel. In this reaction, water byproduct and two electrons are given off. These electrons then flow through an external circuit where they can do work. The cycle then repeats as those electrons enter the cathode material again.

=== Balance of plant ===
Most of the downtime of an SOFC is caused by the mechanical balance of the plant (from components like the air preheater, prereformer, afterburner, water heat exchanger, and anode tail gas oxidizer) and the electrical balance of the plant (including the power electronics, hydrogen sulfide sensor and fans). By using internal reforming (converting methane into hydrogen internally), lower cooling requirements are needed, helping decrease the complexity and costs of the balance of plant.

=== Anode ===
The ceramic anode layer must be very porous to allow the fuel to flow towards the electrolyte. Consequently, granular matter is often selected for anode fabrication procedures. Like the cathode, it must conduct electrons. A capacity for ionic conductivity is an additional advantage. The anode's smaller polarization losses allows a comparatively thicker layer to provide the cell's mechanical support.

The electrochemical function of the anode is to facilitate the oxidation of a fuel, typically hydrogen, to produce heat, water and electricity. Where a light hydrocarbon (e.g. methane) is used, the anode can also act as a catalyst for steam reformation of the fuel. This provides another operational benefit to the fuel cell stack because the reforming reaction is endothermic, which cools the stack internally.

The most common material used is a cermet made of nickel mixed with the ceramic material used for the electrolyte in that particular cell, typically YSZ (yttria stabilized zirconia). Anodes can be produced by tape casting, using slurry prepared by sonication. This low-impact mixing allows for the effective combination of NiO-YSZ slurries in about 30 minutes, much faster than conventional ball milling (72 hours). The nanomaterial-based catalysts help stop the grain growth of nickel. Larger grains of nickel would reduce the contact area that ions can be conducted through, which would lower the cell's efficiency. Perovskite materials (mixed ionic/electronic conducting ceramics) have been shown to produce a power density of 0.6 W/cm2 at 0.7 V at 800 °C which is possible because they have the ability to overcome a larger activation energy.

==== Chemical Reaction ====
H_{2} + O^{2-} —> H_{2}O + 2e^{-}

However, a few disadvantages are associated with YSZ as an anode material. Ni coarsening, carbon deposition, reduction-oxidation instability, and sulfur poisoning are the main obstacles limiting the long-term stability of Ni-YSZ. Ni coarsening refers to the evolution of Ni particles in YSZ, which grows larger in grain size, decreasing the surface area for the catalytic reaction. Carbon deposition occurs when carbon atoms, formed by hydrocarbon pyrolysis or CO disproportionation, deposit on the Ni catalytic surface. Carbon deposition becomes important, especially when hydrocarbon fuels, i.e., methane and syngas, are used. The high operating temperature of SOFC and the oxidizing environment facilitate the oxidation of Ni catalyst through the reaction Ni + 1/2 O_{2} = NiO. The oxidation reaction of Ni reduces the electrocatalytic activity and conductivity. Moreover, the density difference between Ni and NiO causes volume change on the anode surface, potentially leading to mechanical failure. Sulfur poisoning arises when fuel such as natural gas, gasoline, or diesel is used. Again, due to the high affinity between sulfur compounds (H_{2}S, (CH_{3})_{2}S) and the metal catalyst, even the smallest impurities of sulfur compounds in the feed stream could deactivate the Ni catalyst on the YSZ surface.

Current research is focused on reducing or replacing Ni content in the anode to improve long-term performance. The modified Ni-YSZ containing other materials, including CeO_{2}, Y_{2}O_{3}, La_{2}O_{3}, MgO, TiO_{2}, Ru, Co, etc., have been invented to resist sulfur poisoning, but the improvement is limited due to the rapid initial degradation. Copper-based cermet anode is considered a solution to carbon deposition because it is inert to carbon and stable under typical SOFC oxygen partial pressures (pO_{2}). Cu-Co bimetallic anodes show a great resistance to carbon deposition after exposure to pure CH_{4} at 800C. Cu-CeO_{2}-YSZ exhibits a higher electrochemical oxidation rate over Ni-YSZ when running on CO and syngas. It can achieve even higher performance using CO than H_{2}, after adding a cobalt co-catalyst. Oxide anodes, including zirconia-based fluorite and perovskites, are also used to replace Ni-ceramic anodes for carbon resistance. Chromite, i.e., La_{0.8}Sr_{0.2}Cr_{0.5}Mn_{0.5}O_{3} (LSCM), is used as anodes and exhibited comparable performance against Ni–YSZ cermet anodes. LSCM is further improved by impregnating Cu and sputtering Pt as the current collector.

=== Electrolyte ===
The electrolyte is a dense layer of ceramic that conducts oxygen ions. Its electronic conductivity must be kept as low as possible to prevent losses from leakage currents. The high operating temperatures of SOFCs allow the kinetics of oxygen ion transport to be sufficient for good performance. However, as the operating temperature approaches the lower limit for SOFCs at around 600 °C, the electrolyte begins to have large ionic transport resistances and affect the performance. Popular electrolyte materials include yttria-stabilized zirconia (YSZ) (often the 8% form 8YSZ), scandia stabilized zirconia (ScSZ) (usually 9 mol% Sc_{2}O_{3} – 9ScSZ) and gadolinium doped ceria (GDC). The electrolyte material has a crucial influence on the cell performance. Detrimental reactions between YSZ electrolytes and modern cathodes such as lanthanum strontium cobalt ferrite (LSCF) have been found, and can be prevented by thin (<100 nm) ceria diffusion barriers.

If the conductivity for oxygen ions in SOFC can remain high even at lower temperatures (current target in research ~500 °C), material choices for SOFC will broaden, and many existing problems can be solved. Certain processing techniques, such as thin film deposition, can help solve this problem with existing materials by:

- reducing the traveling distance of oxygen ions and electrolyte resistance, as resistance is proportional to conductor length;
- producing grain structures that are less resistive, such as columnar grain structure;
- controlling the microstructural nano-crystalline fine grains to achieve "fine-tuning" of electrical properties;
- building composite possessing large interfacial areas, as interfaces have been shown to have extraordinary electrical properties.

In 2025, Kyushu University researchers successfully re-engineering an SOFC electrolyte to develop one that is operational at 300 °C (500 °F). The lower-temperature innovation may facilitate lower-cost SOFCs. Termed a "scandium superhighway", the significantly lower temperature is made viable via "a high-density network of Sc–O bonds in scandium-doped" barium stannate (BSO) and barium titanate (BTO) ceramics, which cuts the proton migration barrier, unlocking rapid proton transport. Findings were published in August 2025, in the peer-reviewed materials science and engineering journal, Nature Materials.

=== Cathode ===
The cathode, or air electrode, is a thin porous layer on the electrolyte where oxygen reduction occurs. The overall reaction is written in Kröger-Vink Notation as follows:

$$\ce{\frac{1}{2}{O2(g)} + 2{e'} + {V}^{\bullet\bullet}_o -> {O}^{\times}_o}$$

Cathode materials must be, at a minimum, electrically conductive. Currently, lanthanum strontium manganite (LSM) is the cathode material of choice for commercial use because of its compatibility with doped zirconia electrolytes. Mechanically, it has a similar coefficient of thermal expansion to YSZ and thus limits stress buildup because of CTE mismatch. Also, LSM has low levels of chemical reactivity with YSZ, which extends the lifetime of the materials. Unfortunately, LSM is a poor ionic conductor, so the electrochemically active reaction is limited to the triple phase boundary (TPB) where the electrolyte, air and electrode meet. LSM works well as a cathode at high temperatures, but its performance quickly falls as the operating temperature is below 800 °C. To increase the reaction zone beyond the TPB, a potential cathode material must be able to conduct both electrons and oxygen ions. Composite cathodes consisting of LSM YSZ have been used to increase this triple-phase boundary length. Mixed ionic/electronic conducting (MIEC) ceramics, such as perovskite LSCF, are also being researched for use in intermediate temperature SOFCs as they are more active and can make up for the increase in the activation energy of the reaction.

=== Interconnect ===
The interconnect can be either a metallic or ceramic component between each cell. Its purpose is to connect each cell in series, so that the voltage each cell generates can be combined. Because the interconnect is exposed to the cell's oxidizing and reducing side at high temperatures, it must be extremely stable. For this reason, ceramics have been traditionally used as interconnect materials. However, these ceramic interconnect materials are very expensive when compared to metals. Nowadays, lower operating temperatures (600–850 °C) are common, and almost all SOFC designs use ferritic stainless steel (Fe-Cr Steel with bcc structure). Alternatively, a Cr based Cr-5Fe-1Y2O3 alloy is used in some designs. Ceramic-metal composites called "cermet" are also under consideration, as they have demonstrated thermal stability at high temperatures and excellent electrical conductivity.

== Polarizations ==
Polarizations, or overpotentials, are losses in voltage due to imperfections in materials, microstructure, and design of the fuel cell. Polarizations result from ohmic resistance of oxygen ions conducting through the electrolyte (iRΩ), electrochemical activation barriers at the anode and cathode, and finally concentration polarizations due to the inability of gases to diffuse at high rates through the porous anode and cathode (shown as ηA for the anode and ηC for the cathode). The cell voltage can be calculated using the following equation:

$${V} = {E}_0 - {iR}_\omega - {\eta}_\text{cathode} - {\eta}_\text{anode}$$

where:

- ${E}_0$ = Nernst potential of the reactants
- R = Thévenin equivalent resistance value of the electrically conducting portions of the cell
- ${\eta}_\text{cathode}$ = polarization losses in the cathode
- ${\eta}_\text{anode}$ = polarization losses in the anode

In SOFCs, it is often important to focus on the ohmic and concentration polarizations since high operating temperatures experience little activation polarization. However, as the lower limit of SOFC operating temperature is approached (~600 °C), these polarizations do become important.

Above mentioned equation is used for determining the SOFC voltage (in fact for fuel cell voltage in general). This approach results in good agreement with particular experimental data (for which adequate factors were obtained) and poor agreement for other than original experimental working parameters. Moreover, most of the equations used require the addition of numerous factors which are difficult or impossible to determine. It makes very difficult any optimizing process of the SOFC working parameters as well as design architecture configuration selection. Because of those circumstances a few other equations were proposed:

$$E_{SOFC} = \frac{E_{\max}-i_{\max}\cdot\eta_f\cdot r_1}{\frac{r_1}{r_2}\cdot\left( 1-\eta_f \right) + 1}$$

where:

- $E_{SOFC}$ = cell voltage
- $E_{\max}$ = maximum voltage given by the Nernst equation
- $i_{\max}$ = maximum current density (for given fuel flow)
- $\eta_f$ = fuel utilization factor
- $r_1$ = ionic specific resistance of the electrolyte
- $r_2$ = electric specific resistance of the electrolyte.

This method was validated and found suitable for optimization and sensitivity studies in plant-level modelling of various systems with solid oxide fuel cells. With this mathematical description, it is possible to account for different properties of the SOFC. Many parameters which impact cell working conditions, e.g., electrolyte material, electrolyte thickness, cell temperature, inlet and outlet gas compositions at anode and cathode, and electrode porosity, just to name some. The flow in these systems is often calculated using the Navier–Stokes equations.

=== Ohmic polarization ===
Ohmic losses in an SOFC result from ionic conductivity through the electrolyte and electrical resistance offered to the flow of electrons in the external electrical circuit. This is inherently a material property of the crystal structure and atoms involved. However, to maximize the ionic conductivity, several methods can be used. Firstly, operating at higher temperatures can significantly decrease these ohmic losses. Substitutional doping methods to further refine the crystal structure and control defect concentrations can also play a significant role in increasing the conductivity. Another way to decrease ohmic resistance is to decrease the thickness of the electrolyte layer.

==== Ionic conductivity ====
An ionic specific resistance of the electrolyte as a function of temperature can be described by the following relationship:

$$r_1 = \frac{\delta}{\sigma}$$

where: $\delta$ – electrolyte thickness, and $\sigma$ – ionic conductivity.

The ionic conductivity of the solid oxide is defined as follows:

$$\sigma = \sigma_0\cdot e^\frac{-E}{R\cdot T}$$

where: $\sigma_0$ and E – factors depended on electrolyte materials, T – electrolyte temperature, and R – ideal gas constant.

=== Concentration polarization ===
The concentration polarization is the result of practical limitations on mass transport within the cell and represents the voltage loss due to spatial variations in reactant concentration at the chemically active sites. This situation can be caused when the reactants are consumed by the electrochemical reaction faster than they can diffuse into the porous electrode, and can also be caused by variation in bulk flow composition. The latter is due to the fact that the consumption of reacting species in the reactant flows causes a drop in reactant concentration as it travels along the cell, which causes a drop in the local potential near the tail end of the cell.

The concentration polarization occurs in both the anode and cathode. The anode can be particularly problematic, as the oxidation of the hydrogen produces steam, which further dilutes the fuel stream as it travels along the length of the cell. This polarization can be mitigated by reducing the reactant utilization fraction or increasing the electrode porosity, but these approaches each have significant design trade-offs.

=== Activation polarization ===
The activation polarization is the result of the kinetics involved with the electrochemical reactions. Each reaction has a certain activation barrier that must be overcome to proceed, and this barrier leads to the polarization. The activation barrier is the result of many complex electrochemical reaction steps where typically the rate limiting step is responsible for the polarization. The polarization equation shown below is found by solving the Butler–Volmer equation in the high current density regime (where the cell typically operates), and can be used to estimate the activation polarization:

$${\eta}_\text{act} = \frac {RT} {{\beta}zF} \times ln \left(\frac {i} {{i}_0} \right)$$

where:

- R = gas constant
- ${T}_0$ = operating temperature
- ${\beta}$ = electron transfer coefficient
- z = electrons associated with the electrochemical reaction
- F = Faraday's constant
- i = operating current
- $i_0$ = exchange current density

The polarization can be modified by microstructural optimization. The Triple Phase Boundary (TPB) length, which is the length where porous, ionic and electronically conducting pathways all meet, directly relates to the electrochemically active length in the cell. The larger the length, the more reactions can occur and thus the less the activation polarization. Optimization of TPB length can be done by processing conditions to affect microstructure or by materials selection to use a mixed ionic/electronic conductor to further increase TPB length.

== Mechanical properties ==
Current SOFC research focuses heavily on optimizing cell performance while maintaining acceptable mechanical properties because optimized performance often compromises mechanical properties. Nevertheless, mechanical failure represents a significant problem to SOFC operation. The presence of various kinds of load and Thermal stress during operation requires high mechanical strength. Additional stresses associated with changes in gas atmosphere, leading to reduction or oxidation also cannot be avoided in prolonged operation. When electrode layers delaminate or crack, conduction pathways are lost, leading to a redistribution of current density and local changes in temperature. These local temperature deviations, in turn, lead to increased thermal strains, which propagate cracks and Delamination. Additionally, when electrolytes crack, separation of fuel and air is no longer guaranteed, which further endangers the continuous operation of the cell.

Since SOFCs require materials with high oxygen conductivity, thermal stresses provide a significant problem. The Coefficient of thermal expansion in mixed ionic-electronic perovskites can be directly related to oxygen vacancy concentration, which is also related to ionic conductivity. Thus, thermal stresses increase in direct correlation with improved cell performance. Additionally, however, the temperature dependence of oxygen vacancy concentration means that the CTE is not a linear property, which further complicates measurements and predictions.

Just as thermal stresses increase as cell performance improves through improved ionic conductivity, the fracture toughness of the material also decreases as cell performance increases. This is because, to increase reaction sites, porous ceramics are preferable. However, as shown in the equation below, fracture toughness decreases as porosity increases.

$$K_\text{IC} = K_\text{IC,0}\exp{(-b_{k}p')}$$

Where:

$K_\text{IC}$ = fracture toughness
$K_\text{IC,0}$ = fracture toughness of the non-porous structure
$b_k$ = experimentally determined constant
$p'$ = porosity

Thus, porosity must be carefully engineered to maximize reaction kinetics while maintaining an acceptable fracture toughness. Since fracture toughness represents the ability of pre-existing cracks or pores to propagate, a potentially more useful metric is the failure stress of a material, as this depends on sample dimensions instead of crack diameter. Failure stresses in SOFCs can also be evaluated using a ring-on ring biaxial stress test. This type of test is generally preferred, as sample edge quality does not significantly impact measurements. The determination of the sample's failure stress is shown in the equation below.

$$\sigma_\text{cr}= \frac{3F_\text{cr}}{2\pi h_{s}^{2}}+
\Biggl((1-\nu)\frac{D_\text{sup}^{2}-D_\text{load}^{2}}{2D_{s}^{2}}+(1+\nu)\ln\left ( \frac{D_\text{sup}}{D_\text{load}} \right )\Biggr)$$

Where:

$\sigma_\text{cr}$ = failure stress of the small deformation
$F_\text{cr}$ = critical applied force
$h_s$ = height of the sample
$\nu$ = Poisson's ratio
D = diameter (sup = support ring, load = loading ring, s = sample)

However, this equation is not valid for deflections exceeding 1/2h, making it less applicable for thin samples, which are of great interest in SOFCs. Therefore, while this method does not require knowledge of crack or pore size, it must be used with great caution and is more applicable to support layers in SOFCs than active layers. In addition to failure stresses and fracture toughness, modern fuel cell designs that favor mixed ionic electronic conductors (MIECs), Creep (deformation) pose another great problem, as MIEC electrodes often operate at temperatures exceeding half of the melting temperature. As a result, diffusion creep must also be considered.

$$\dot{\epsilon}_\text{eq}^\text{creep}=\frac{\tilde{k}_0D}{T}\frac{\sigma_\text{eq}^{m}}{d_\text{grain}^{n}}$$

Where:

$\dot{\epsilon}_\text{eq}^\text{creep}$ = equivalent creep strain
D = Diffusion coefficient
T = temperature
$\tilde{k}_0$ = kinetic constant
$\sigma_\text{eq}$ = equivalent stress (e.g. von Mises)
m = creep stress exponential factor
n = particle size exponent (2 for Nabarro–Herring creep, 3 for Coble creep)

To properly model creep strain rates, knowledge of Microstructure is therefore of significant importance. Due to the difficulty in mechanically testing SOFCs at high temperatures, and due to the microstructural evolution of SOFCs over the lifetime of operation resulting from Grain growth and coarsening, the actual creep behavior of SOFCs is currently not completely understood

== Target ==
DOE target requirements are 40,000 hours of service for stationary fuel cell applications and greater than 5,000 hours for transportation systems (fuel cell vehicles) at a factory cost of $40/kW for a 10 kW coal-based system without additional requirements. Lifetime effects (phase stability, thermal expansion compatibility, element migration, conductivity and aging) must be addressed. The Solid State Energy Conversion Alliance 2008 (interim) target for overall degradation per 1,000 hours is 4.0%.

== Research ==
Research is going now in the direction of lower-temperature SOFCs (600 °C). Low temperature systems can reduce costs by reducing insulation, materials, start-up and degradation-related costs. With higher operating temperatures, the temperature gradient increases the severity of thermal stresses, which affects materials cost and life of the system. An intermediate temperature system (650-800 °C) would enable the use of cheaper metallic materials with better mechanical properties and thermal conductivity. New developments in nano-scale electrolyte structures have been shown to bring down operating temperatures to around 350 °C, which would enable the use of even cheaper steel and elastomeric/polymeric components.

Lowering operating temperatures has the added benefit of increased efficiency. Theoretical fuel cell efficiency increases with decreasing temperature. For example, the efficiency of a SOFC using CO as fuel increases from 63% to 81% when decreasing the system temperature from 900 °C to 350 °C.

Research is also under way to improve the fuel flexibility of SOFCs. While stable operation has been achieved on a variety of hydrocarbon fuels, these cells typically rely on external fuel processing. In the case of natural gas, the fuel is either externally or internally reformed and the sulfur compounds are removed. These processes add to the cost and complexity of SOFC systems. Work is under way at a number of institutions to improve the stability of anode materials for hydrocarbon oxidation and, therefore, relax the requirements for fuel processing and decrease SOFC balance of plant costs.

Research is also going on in reducing start-up time to be able to implement SOFCs in mobile applications. This can be partially achieved by lowering operating temperatures, which is the case for proton-exchange membrane fuel cell (PEMFCs). Due to their fuel flexibility, they may run on partially reformed diesel, and this makes SOFCs interesting as auxiliary power units (APU) in refrigerated trucks.

Specifically, Delphi Automotive Systems are developing an SOFC that will power auxiliary units in automobiles and tractor-trailers, while BMW has recently stopped a similar project. A high-temperature SOFC will generate all of the needed electricity to allow the engine to be smaller and more efficient. The SOFC would run on the same gasoline or diesel as the engine and would keep the air conditioning unit and other necessary electrical systems running while the engine shuts off when not needed (e.g., at a stop light or truck stop).

Rolls-Royce is developing solid-oxide fuel cells produced by screen printing onto inexpensive ceramic materials. Rolls-Royce Fuel Cell Systems Ltd is developing an SOFC gas turbine hybrid system fueled by natural gas for power generation applications in the order of a megawatt (e.g. Futuregen).

3D printing is being explored as a possible manufacturing technique that could be used to make SOFC manufacturing easier by the Shah Lab at Northwestern University. This manufacturing technique would allow SOFC cell structure to be more flexible, which could lead to more efficient designs. This process could work in the production of any part of the cell. The 3D printing process works by combining about 80% ceramic particles with 20% binders and solvents, and then converting that slurry into an ink that can be fed into a 3D printer. Some of the solvent is very volatile, so the ceramic ink solidifies almost immediately. Not all of the solvent evaporates, so the ink maintains some flexibility before it is fired at high temperature to densify it. This flexibility allows the cells to be fired in a circular shape that would increase the surface area over which electrochemical reactions can occur, which increases the efficiency of the cell. Also, the 3D printing technique allows the cell layers to be printed on top of each other instead of having to go through separate manufacturing and stacking steps. The thickness is easy to control, and layers can be made in the exact size and shape that is needed, so waste is minimized.

Ceres Power Ltd. has developed a low cost and low temperature (500–600 degrees) SOFC stack using cerium gadolinium oxide (CGO) in place of current industry standard ceramic, yttria stabilized zirconia (YSZ), which allows the use of stainless steel to support the ceramic.

Solid Cell Inc. has developed a unique, low-cost cell architecture that combines properties of planar and tubular designs, along with a Cr-free cermet interconnect.

The high temperature electrochemistry center (HITEC) at the University of Florida, Gainesville is focused on studying ionic transport, electrocatalytic phenomena and microstructural characterization of ion conducting materials.

SiEnergy Systems, a Harvard spin-off company, has demonstrated the first macro-scale thin-film solid-oxide fuel cell that can operate at 500 degrees.

=== SOEC ===
A solid oxide electrolyser cell (SOEC) is a solid oxide fuel cell set in regenerative mode for the electrolysis of water with a solid oxide, or ceramic, electrolyte to produce oxygen and hydrogen gas.

SOECs can also be used to do electrolysis of CO_{2} to produce CO and oxygen or even co-electrolysis of water and CO_{2} to produce syngas and oxygen.

=== ITSOFC ===
SOFCs that operate in an intermediate temperature (IT) range, meaning between 600 and 800 °C, are named ITSOFCs. Because of the high degradation rates and materials costs incurred at temperatures in excess of 900 °C, it is economically more favorable to operate SOFCs at lower temperatures. The push for high-performance ITSOFCs is currently the topic of much research and development. One area of focus is the cathode material. It is thought that the oxygen reduction reaction is responsible for much of the loss in performance so the catalytic activity of the cathode is being studied and enhanced through various techniques, including catalyst impregnation. The research on NdCrO_{3} proves it to be a potential cathode material for the cathode of ITSOFC since it is thermochemically stable within the temperature range.

Another area of focus is electrolyte materials. To make SOFCs competitive in the market, ITSOFCs are pushing towards lower operational temperature by use of alternative new materials. However, efficiency and stability of the materials limit their feasibility. One choice for the electrolyte new materials is the ceria-salt ceramic composites (CSCs). The two-phase CSC electrolytes GDC (gadolinium-doped ceria) and SDC (samaria-doped ceria)-MCO_{3} (M=Li, Na, K, single or mixture of carbonates) can reach the power density of 300-800 mW*cm^{−2}.

=== LT-SOFC ===
Low-temperature solid oxide fuel cells (LT-SOFCs), operating lower than 650 °C, are of great interest for future research because the high operating temperature is currently what restricts the development and deployment of SOFCs. A low-temperature SOFC is more reliable due to smaller thermal mismatch and easier sealing. Additionally, a lower temperature requires less insulation and therefore has a lower cost. Cost is further lowered due to wider material choices for interconnects and compressive nonglass/ceramic seals. Perhaps most importantly, at a lower temperature, SOFCs can be started more rapidly and with less energy, which lends itself to uses in portable and transportable applications.

As temperature decreases, the maximum theoretical fuel cell efficiency increases, in contrast to the Carnot cycle. For example, the maximum theoretical efficiency of an SOFC using CO as a fuel increases from 63% at 900 °C to 81% at 350 °C.

This is a materials issue, particularly for the electrolyte in the SOFC. YSZ is the most commonly used electrolyte because of its superior stability, despite not having the highest conductivity. Currently, the thickness of YSZ electrolytes is a minimum of ~10 μm due to deposition methods, and this requires a temperature above 700 °C. Therefore, low-temperature SOFCs are only possible with higher conductivity electrolytes. Various alternatives that could be successful at low temperature include gadolinium-doped ceria (GDC) and erbia-cation-stabilized bismuth (ERB). They have superior ionic conductivity at lower temperatures, but this comes at the expense of lower thermodynamic stability. CeO_{2} electrolytes become electronically conductive and Bi_{2}O_{3} electrolytes decompose to metallic Bi under the reducing fuel environment.

To combat this, researchers created a functionally graded ceria/bismuth-oxide bilayered electrolyte where the GDC layer on the anode side protects the ESB layer from decomposing while the ESB on the cathode side blocks the leakage current through the GDC layer. This leads to near-theoretical open-circuit potential (OPC) with two highly conductive electrolytes, that by themselves would not have been sufficiently stable for the application. This bilayer proved to be stable for 1400 hours of testing at 500 °C and showed no indication of interfacial phase formation or thermal mismatch. While this makes strides towards lowering the operating temperature of SOFCs, it also opens doors for future research to try and understand this mechanism.

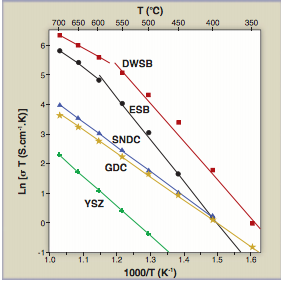
Comparison of ionic conductivity of various solid oxide electrolytes

Researchers at the Georgia Institute of Technology dealt with the instability of BaCeO_{3} differently. They replaced a desired fraction of Ce in BaCeO_{3} with Zr to form a solid solution that exhibits proton conductivity, but also chemical and thermal stability over the range of conditions relevant to fuel cell operation. A new specific composition, Ba(Zr_{0.1}Ce_{0.7}Y_{0.2})O_{3-δ} (BZCY7) that displays the highest ionic conductivity of all known electrolyte materials for SOFC applications. This electrolyte was fabricated by dry-pressing powders, which allowed for the production of crack free films thinner than 15 μm. The implementation of this simple and cost-effective fabrication method may enable significant cost reductions in SOFC fabrication. However, this electrolyte operates at higher temperatures than the bilayered electrolyte model, closer to 600 °C rather than 500 °C.

Currently, given the state of the field for LT-SOFCs, progress in the electrolyte would reap the most benefits, but research into potential anode and cathode materials would also lead to useful results, and has started to be discussed more frequently in literature.

=== SOFC-GT ===
An SOFC-GT system is one which comprises a solid oxide fuel cell combined with a gas turbine. While concrete architectures may vary, the general concept routes at least part of the air passing through the gas turbine compressor through the SOFC, thus supplying (part of) the required preheating, and pressurized cathode gas, which permits the SOFC to operate at higher specific power, and uses the heat produced by the SOFC to either replace or assist the gas turbine combustor in elevating the temperature of gas entering the turbine. A review by Buonomano et al finds that a large range of system architectures is investigated for different fuel types and purposes. Identified use cases cover either stationary or mobile generation of either electricity or mechanical power, in combination with each other and/or heat, or making use of byproducts from the SOFC pre-reformer. While theoretical studies show considerable potential, the range of concepts being investigated and the low number of practical implementations also reflects the fact that SOFC-GT technology has not yet matured to a point where established solutions exist.

Theoretically, the combination of the SOFC and gas turbine can result in high overall (electrical and thermal) efficiency.. Such systems have been evaluated by Siemens Westinghouse and Rolls-Royce as a means to achieve higher operating efficiencies by running the SOFC under pressure. SOFC-GT systems typically include anodic and/or cathodic atmosphere recirculation, thus increasing efficiency.

Further combination of the SOFC-GT in a combined cooling, heat and power (or trigeneration) configuration (via HVAC) also has the potential to yield even higher thermal efficiencies in some cases.

Another potential feature of hybrid SOFC-GT systems is 100% CO_{2} capturing at comparatively high energy efficiency. These features like zero CO_{2} emission and high energy efficiency make the power plant performance noteworthy.

=== DCFC ===
For the direct use of solid coal fuel without additional gasification and reforming processes, a direct carbon fuel cell (DCFC) has been developed as a promising novel concept of a high-temperature energy conversion system. The underlying progress in the development of a coal-based DCFC has been categorized mainly according to the electrolyte materials used, such as solid oxide, molten carbonate, and molten hydroxide, as well as hybrid systems consisting of solid oxide and molten carbonate binary electrolyte or of liquid anode (Fe, Ag, In, Sn, Sb, Pb, Bi, and its alloying and its metal/metal oxide) solid oxide electrolyte. People's research on DCFC with GDC-Li/Na_{2}CO_{3} as the electrolyte, Sm_{0.5}Sr_{0.5}CoO_{3} as cathode shows good performance. The highest power density of 48 mW/cm^{2} can be reached at 500 °C with O_{2} and CO_{2} as oxidant and the whole system is stable within the temperature range of 500 °C to 600 °C.

==== SOFC operated on landfill gas ====
Every household produces waste/garbage on a daily basis. In 2009, Americans produced about 243 million tons of municipal solid waste, which is 4.3 pounds of waste per person per day. All that waste is sent to landfill sites. Landfill gas which is produced from the decomposition of waste that gets accumulated at the landfills has the potential to be a valuable source of energy since methane is a major constituent. Currently, the majority of the landfills either burn away their gas in flares or combust it in mechanical engines to produce electricity. The issue with mechanical engines is that incomplete combustion of gasses can lead to pollution of the atmosphere and is also highly inefficient.

The issue with using landfill gas to fuel an SOFC system is that landfill gas contains hydrogen sulfide. Any landfill accepting biological waste will contain about 50-60 ppm of hydrogen sulfide and around 1-2 ppm mercaptans. However, construction materials containing reducible sulfur species, principally sulfates found in gypsum-based wallboard, can cause considerably higher levels of sulfides in the hundreds of ppm. At operating temperatures of 750 °C hydrogen sulfide concentrations of around 0.05 ppm begin to affect the performance of the SOFCs.

Ni + H_{2}S → NiS + H_{2}

The above reaction controls the effect of sulfur on the anode.

This can be prevented by having background hydrogen which is calculated below.

- At 453 K the equilibrium constant is 7.39 × 10^{−5}
- ΔG calculated at 453 K was 35.833 KJ/mol
- Using the standard heat of formation and entropy ΔG at room temperature (298 K) came out to be 45.904 KJ/mol
- On extrapolation to 1023 K, ΔG is −1.229 KJ/mol

On substitution, K_{eq} at 1023 K is 1.44 × 10^{−4}. Hence theoretically we need 3.4% hydrogen to prevent the formation of NiS at 5 ppm H_{2}S.

=== RSOC ===
The need for innovation in the energy storage market has brought upon research in reversible solid-oxide cells (RSOCs). These cells are able to make a power-power conversion by operating alternatively as solid oxide fuel cells (SOFCs) and solid oxide electrolysis cells (SOECs), which can aide in the next generation of green energy technologies that are facing energy transportation and storage difficulties. In 2023, 34% of the energy provided to the grid was "rejected" or lost in the process, meaning that it did not reach the final output that it was meant for (i.e. heat emitted from a lightbulb instead of only photon emissions). A surefire method to convert green hydrogen to energy, or energy to hydrogen as storage, would help considerably reduce energy losses and improve the total efficiency of emerging green energy technologies.

RSOC depiction in both SOEC and SOFC configurations

RSOCs operate similarly to normal SOFCs but can either consume hydrogen fuel to produce electricity (energy production) and oxygen or work the other way around and consume electricity and oxygen to produce hydrogen (energy storage). Because of this, the use of the terms "anode" and "cathode" are obsolete as both electrodes can operate as either an anode or cathode depending on the direction of fuel consumption. Better terminology would be the "fuel electrode" and "oxygen electrode", where the fuel cathode either consumes and oxidizes the fuel (SOFC configuration) or reduces the products to provide fuel (SOEC configuration). The oxygen electrode would either reduce oxygen (SOFC configuration) or oxidize oxygen ions to produce oxygen gas (SOEC configuration). Similarly to SOFCs, the fuel electrode is typically made of a mixture of nickel and yttrium-stabilized zirconia. The oxygen electrode is typically made of perovskite materials, like lanthanum strontium cobalt ferrite (LCSF) and lanthanum strontium chromite (LSC).

Research interest for RSOCs greatly involves the oxygen cathode material. As mentioned above, the traditional material for an RSOC oxygen cathode is a perovskite. Perovskites (formula ABO_{3}) are used because of their cubic structure that allows for oxygen conductivity. Among perovskites, the ones used for an RSOC have a lanthanide or an alkaline earth metal ion in the A site and a small radius transition metal in the B site. Common problems arise when considering the various operating modes, high temperatures, and need for longevity.

Various combinations of perovskites have been and are currently being researched for the resulting performance in an RSOC. Sr-doped LaMnO_{3} is the most traditional perovskite, but its low ionic conductivity results in poor performance in SOEC configuration. Perovskites with cobalt instead of manganese in the B site are of great research because of their high electronic conductivity. Strontium (Sr) and Barium (Ba) doping in the A site is common because it enhances the pseudo capacitance of the perovskite. Many more combinations of different metals in perovskite structures are undergoing research for their use in RSOC and solar cell applications.

== See also ==
- Auxiliary power unit
- Bloom Energy Server – SOFC product from an American company
- Ceramic Fuel Cells Ltd – Australian company producing solid oxide fuel cells
- Glossary of fuel cell terms
- Hydrogen technologies
- Micro combined heat and power
