= Electrolyzer =

Device to separate some chemical compounds into their constituent parts

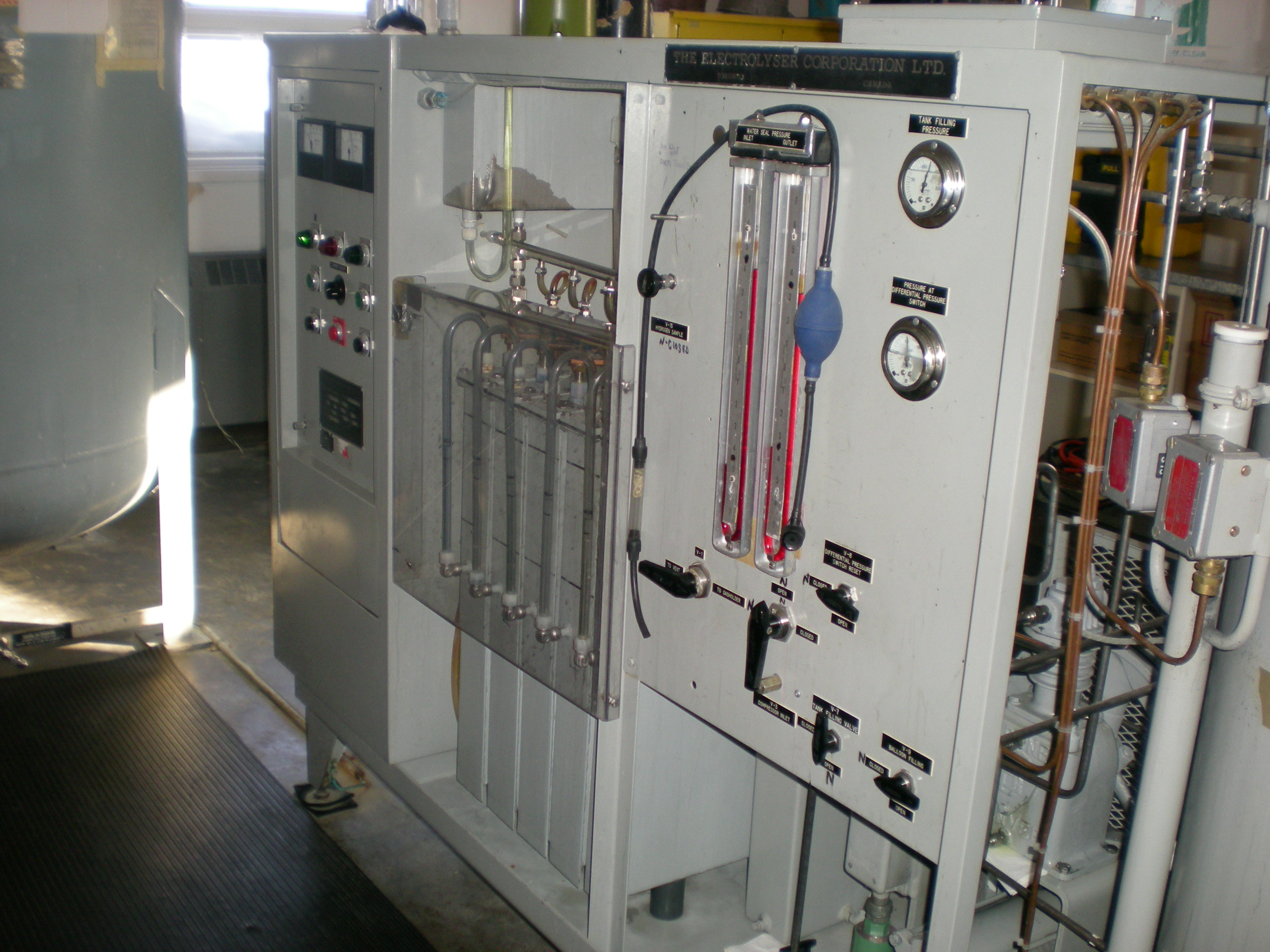
Electrolyser front with gauges and manometer closest.

An electrolyzer (American English) or electrolyser (British English) is a device that uses electrolysis to separate some chemical compounds into their constituent parts; device that performs electrolysis. However, in most cases this word is associated with Water Electrolyzers (WE), devices that consume water and electrical energy to produce hydrogen and oxygen. The hydrogen produced by electrolyzers can be used in various processes, such as replenishing hydrogen fuel cells, producing fertilizers, manufacturing steel, and other applications.

== Design ==
An electrolyzer typically consists of several components: a cell containing an electrolyte with a feedstock, and two electrodes (the anode and cathode). When an electric potential difference is applied between the electrodes, an electric current flows through the cell. Depending on the type of electrolyzer, an electrolyte can be represented as a membrane, that passes only certain ions or as a liquid solution increasing the electrical conductivity of the whole solution inside the cell.

The enclosure material of electrolyzers is usually copper-free aluminum, 316L or 304L stainless steel.

== Types of water electrolyzers ==
Anion Exchange Membrane Water Electrolyzer (AEM)

There are 4 main types of water electrolyzers: Alkaline Electrolyzers, Proton Exchange Membrane Electrolyzers, Anion Exchange Membrane Electrolyzers and Solid Oxide Electrolyzers.

An alkaline electrolyzer (AWE or AEL), uses an aqueous electrolyte solution – usually potassium hydroxide (KOH) or sodium hydroxide (NaOH), with a porous separator. Alkaline electrolyzers typically operate at low temperatures, about 333 K - 363 K.

Proton Exchange Membranes (PEM), Polymer Electrolyte Membrane or Solid Polymer Electrolyte (SPE) are thin polymer electrolyte membranes that passes only positively charged hydrogen ions. At the start of the process, liquid water is supplied to the anode side of the electrolyzer.

Anion Exchange Membrane Electrolyzers (AEM or AEMWE), also known as Zero-gap Alkaline Electrolyzers, are electrolyzers using technology that combines the low-cost benefits of alkaline electrolysis and the compact, zero-gap design of Proton Exchange Membranes, allowing only anions to pass.

Solid Oxide Electrolysers (SOEC) are electrolyzers that use high temperatures to reduce electricity requirements. They require temperatures between 773 K and 1273 K.

== Applications ==
=== Power plants ===
In some powerful power plants hydrogen is used to transmit heat from the power generating winding enclosure to the heat exchanges known as H2 coolers, since hydrogen is 7 times more thermal conductivity than air, and dry hydrogen is non‑corrosive to winding insulation and metal parts. This practice was first used in 1930s-40s at Port Washington Power Plant, as at the one of the most innovative power plants of that time. Typically, hydrogen pressure in systems like that must be at least 207 kPa(g), where the G letter inside parentheses means that the value is measured in gauge pressure, the pressure measured relatively to atmospheric pressure and using atmospheric pressure as the zero point. There are two ways to maintain the pressure in the system: deliver hydrogen in cylinders or make it on site, but to make it n site often is more preferred, since in this way hydrogen doesn't need to be stored and can be produced when it's necessary.

=== Space life-support systems ===
The first electrolyzers used beyond Earth to produce oxygen for crew were placed onboard Mir, Soviet-Russian space station, and represented the "Elektron" (Russian: Электрон) units. The successor of Mir station, the International Space Station, also succeeded the technology of onboard electrolyzers with two systems, designed by NASA. The first one is the Carbon dioxide Reduction System (CRS). Carbon dioxide (CO_{2}), produced by the crew, passes through it in order to, using hydrogen, reduce the carbon dyoxide to methane (CH_{4}) and water:

CO_{2} + 4 H_{2} → CH_{4} + 2 H_{2}O

The methane is vented outboard, as the Oxygen Generation Assembly (OGA), onboard polymer electrolyte membrane (PEM) electrolyzer stack, uses the water to produce oxygen for the crew and hydrogen for the previous system. Since for every mole of methane we loose 2 molecules of hydrogen, the system requires approximately 3 kg of hydrogen per person per year, or 298 kg of water. There is also Elektron system onboard the ISS too, but it's nominally restricted to prevent early failure of the hardware.

=== Energy storage ===
Based on the common classification of hydrogen types, there is so-called Green Hydrogen. Its energy source is mainly renewable electricity. The cycle of green hydrogen consists of an electrolyzer that produces a hydrogen and oxygen and the exact opposite device – a fuel cell, which consumes hydrogen and oxygen, but produces water and electricity. Oxygen is usually taken from the surrounding air, using compressors, although it's also possible to operate without them.

=== Fertilizers ===
Hydrogen is an essential element for ammonia production, and the base element of ammonium fertilizers. Electrolyzers allows us to produce them on an industrial scale using renewable energy sources.

=== Aluminum extraction ===
2 Al_{2}O_{3} → 4 Al + 3 O_{2}

As the word "electrolyzer" typically refers us to water electrolyzers, they can also be used to extract aluminum from aluminium oxide. Since aluminum oxide is classified as an electrical insulator, it needs to be melted so that it can conduct electricity. The melting point of aluminum oxide is over 2,000 K, so it is dissolved in molten cryolite, essentially – an electrolyte, which lowers the melting point of the alloy to approximately 1,200 K, thus allows us to spend less energy and time to start the process of electrolysis.

== Problems ==
Despite the advantages of water electrolyzers, there are problems in their use. One of the main problems is the risk of hydrogen explosions. In order to avoid mixing the fuel with an oxidizer, namely oxygen, from an electolyzer itself or the surrounding air, hydrogen purity is kept high.
