= Greater Hartford =

- Metropolitan Statistical Area
- Hartford–West Hartford–East Hartford, CT MSA
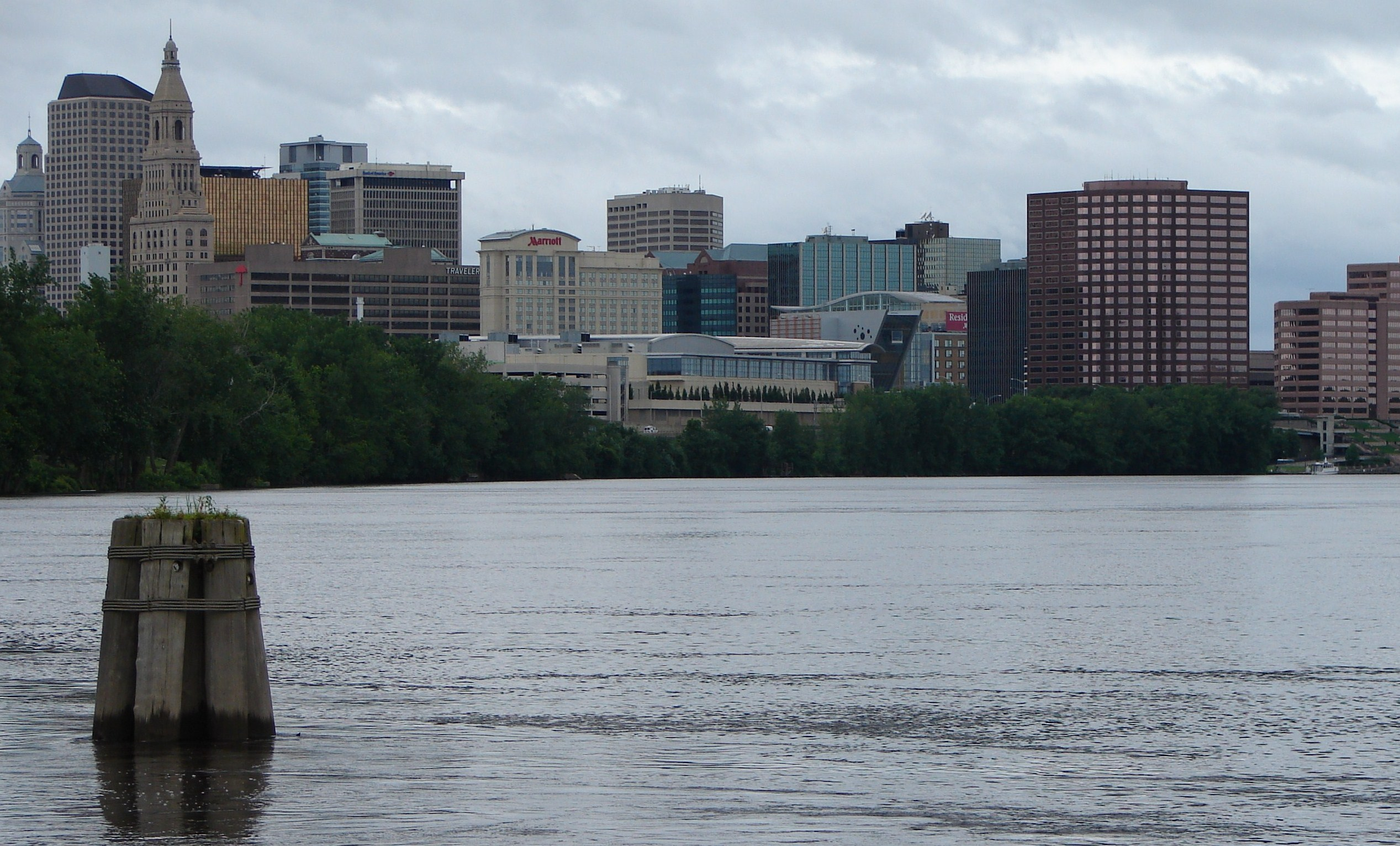
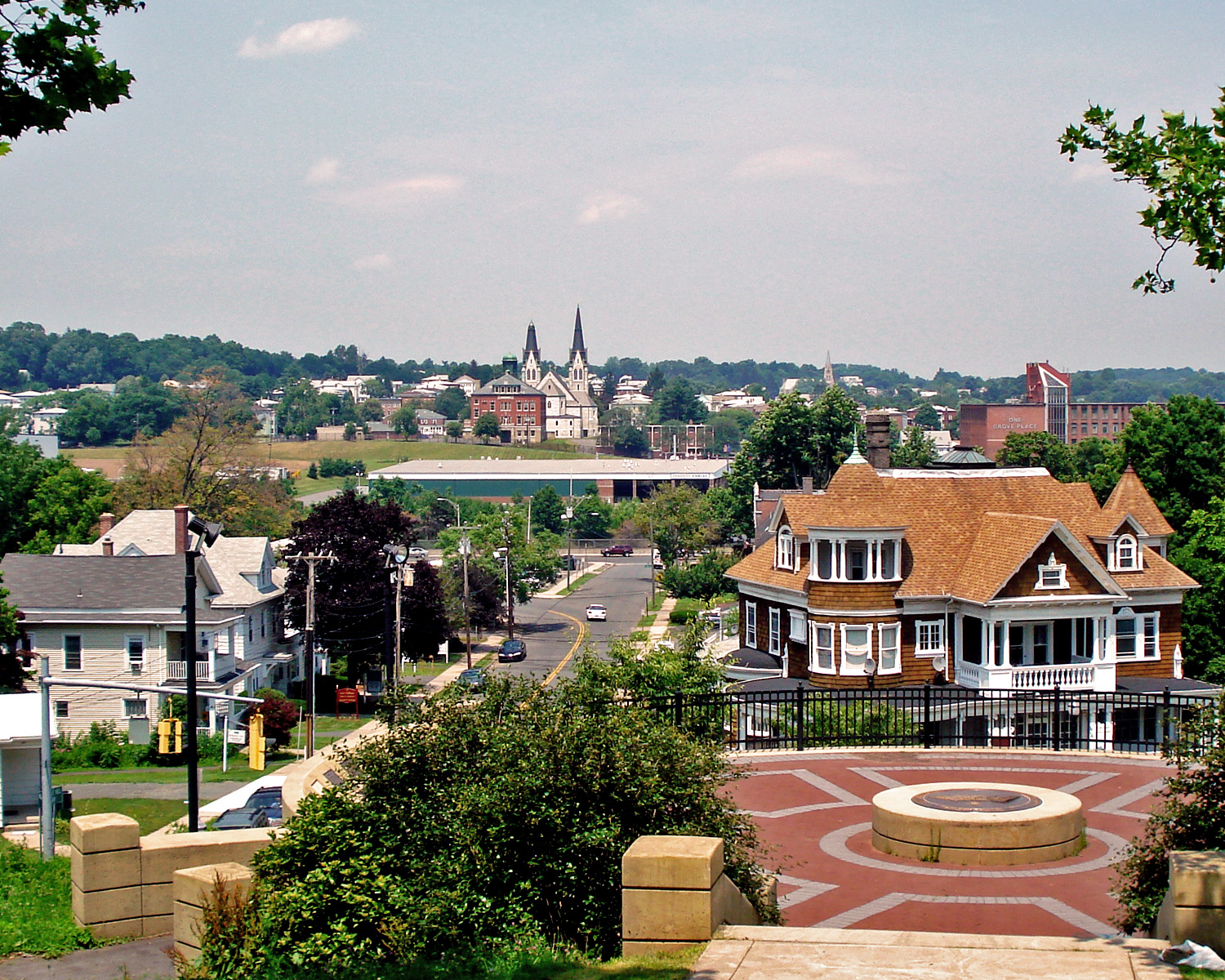
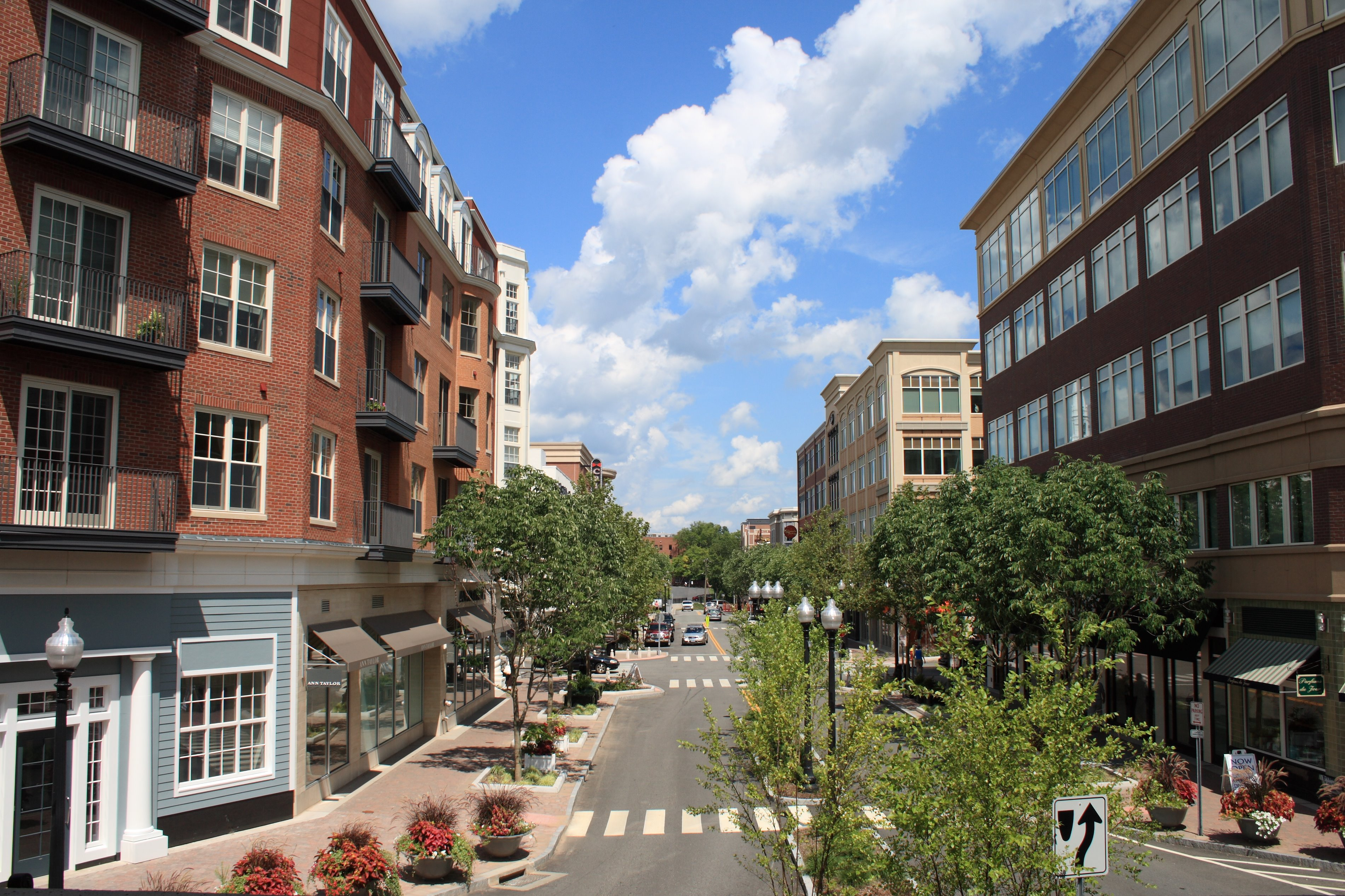
- Top to bottom: Skylines of Hartford, New Britain, and West Hartford
Interactive Map of Hartford–
West Hartford–East Hartford, CT MSA
Hartford–West Hartford–East Hartford, CT
Other Planning Regions in the CSA
- Country: United States
- State: Connecticut
- Principal cities: Hartford; New Britain; West Hartford; Bristol; Manchester; East Hartford; Middletown

Area
  - Total: 3,923 sq mi (10,160 km^{2})

Population (2020)
  - Total: 1,482,086 (CSA)
  - Rank: Ranked 41st in the US for Combined Statistical Areas

GDP
  - MSA: $114.887 billion (2022)
- Time zone: UTC-5 (EST)
  - Summer (DST): UTC-4 (EDT)
- Area codes: 860, 959

Greater Hartford is a region located in the U.S. state of Connecticut, centered on the state's capital of Hartford. It represents the only combined statistical area in Connecticut defined by a city within the state, being bordered by the Greater Boston region to the northeast and New York metropolitan area to the south and west. Sitting at the southern end of the Metacomet Ridge, its geology is characterized by land of a level grade along the shores of Connecticut River Valley, with loamy, finer-grained soil than other regions in the state. Greater Hartford (the metropolitan area as defined by the U.S. Office of Management and Budget), had a total population of 1,150,473 at the 2020 United States census.

Hartford's role as a focal point for the American insurance industry is known nationally. The metropolitan area's affluence and its vibrant music and arts scene define the region's culture. The region's economy is closely tied with Springfield, Massachusetts, with both cities being served by Bradley International Airport and with their shared presence within the Knowledge Corridor, being only 25 miles apart. The area is also served by the smaller Hartford-Brainard Airport.

== Definitions ==
=== New England City and Town Area ===
New England City and Town Areas (NECTAs) were clusters of cities and towns throughout New England defined by the Office of Management and Budget (OMB). The Hartford–East Hartford–Middletown, CT NECTA consisted of 54 towns, including 25 in Hartford County, 5 in Litchfield County, 6 in Middlesex County, 2 in New London County, 12 in Tolland County, and 4 in Windham County. NECTAs were discontinued in July 2023.

=== Metropolitan Statistical Area ===
Historical population
Census	Pop.	Note	%±
1900	195,480		—
1910	250,182		28.0%
1920	336,027		34.3%
1930	421,097		25.3%
1940	450,189		6.9%
1950	539,661		19.9%
1960	847,157		57.0%
1970	1,034,993		22.2%
1980	1,051,606		1.6%
1990	1,123,678		6.9%
2000	1,148,618		2.2%
2010	1,212,381		5.6%
2020	1,213,531		0.1%
U.S. Decennial Census

The OMB also defines the Hartford–West Hartford–East Hartford, CT Metropolitan Statistical Area (MSA) based on Connecticut planning regions. As of July 2023, the area consists of the Capitol and Lower Connecticut River Valley Planning Regions. The 2025 population estimate for the MSA is 1,171,426.

Planning region	2025 estimate	2020 census	Change	Area	Density
Capitol	994,115	976,248	+1.83%	1,046.2 sq mi (2,710 km^{2})	950/sq mi (367/km^{2})
Lower Connecticut River Valley	177,311	174,225	+1.77%	424.1 sq mi (1,098 km^{2})	418/sq mi (161/km^{2})
Total	1,171,426	1,150,473	+1.82%	1,470.3 sq mi (3,808 km^{2})	797/sq mi (308/km^{2})

==== List of municipalities ====
===== 100,000 or more inhabitants =====
- Hartford

===== 50,000 to 100,000 inhabitants =====
- Bristol
- East Hartford
- Manchester
- New Britain
- West Hartford

===== 10,000 to 50,000 inhabitants =====
- Avon
- Berlin
- Bloomfield
- Canton
- Clinton
- Colchester
- Coventry
- Cromwell
- East Hampton
- East Windsor^{1}
- Ellington
- Enfield^{1}
- Farmington
- Glastonbury
- Granby
- Mansfield
- Middletown
- Newington
- Old Saybrook
- Plainville
- Rocky Hill
- Simsbury
- Somers^{1}
- South Windsor
- Southington
- Stafford
- Suffield^{1}
- Tolland
- Vernon
- Wethersfield
- Windsor
- Windsor Locks^{1}

===== 1,000 to 10,000 inhabitants =====
- Andover
- Bolton
- Burlington
- Chester
- Columbia
- Deep River
- Durham
- East Granby
- East Haddam
- Essex
- Haddam
- Hartland
- Hebron
- Killingworth
- Marlborough
- Middlefield
- North Stonington
- Portland
- Westbrook
- Willington

===== Fewer than 1,000 inhabitants =====
- Union

^1 Town also included in the Springfield, Massachusetts NECTA

== Economy ==
=== Notable companies based in Hartford city proper ===
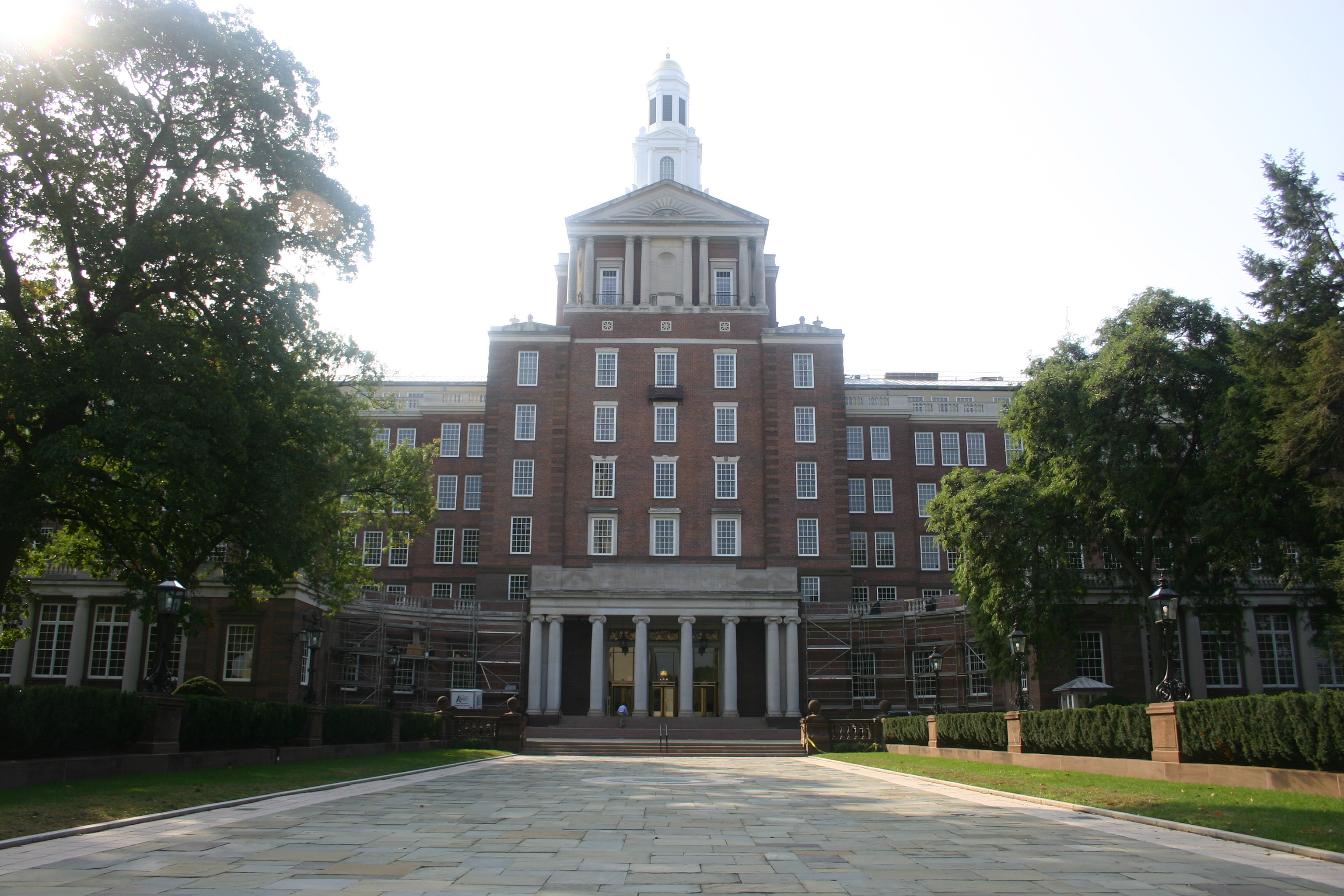
The Aetna headquarters in Hartford

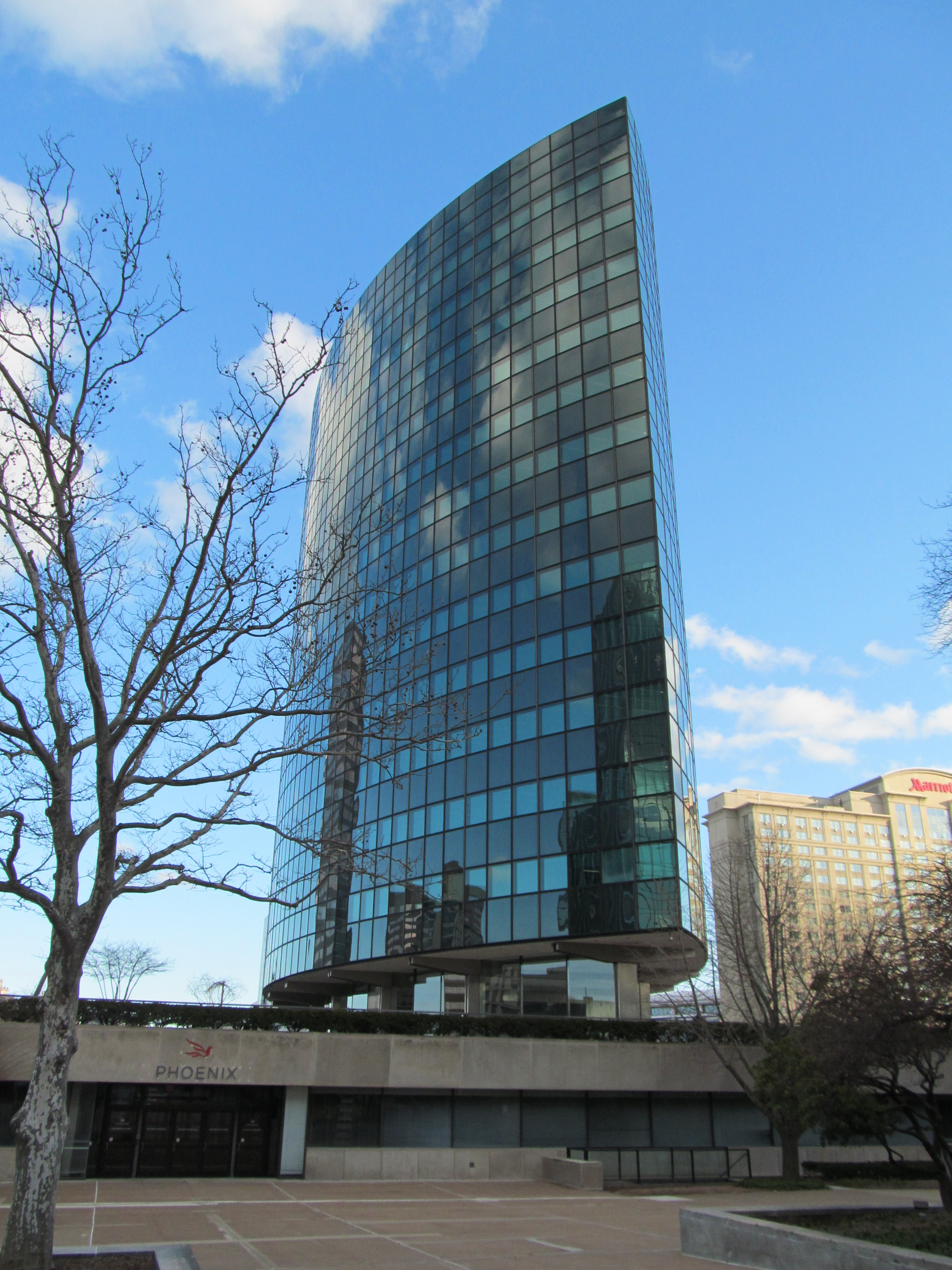
The iconic "boat building" in downtown Hartford is home to The Phoenix Companies

- Aetna
- Eversource Energy (co-headquarters in Boston)
- The Hartford
- Hartford Steam Boiler Inspection and Insurance Company
- The Phoenix Companies
- Travelers Insurance (home of largest office, headquarters in New York City)
- Virtus Investment Partners

=== Notable companies based in surrounding towns ===
- Barnes Group (Bristol)
- Carrier Corporation^{2} (Farmington)
- Cigna (Bloomfield)
- Colt's Manufacturing Company (West Hartford)
- Connecticut Natural Gas (East Hartford)
- Doosan Fuel Cell America (South Windsor)
- ESPN Inc. (Bristol)
- Gerber Scientific (Tolland)
- Henkel (Rocky Hill, U.S. headquarters)
- Kaman Aircraft (Bloomfield)
- Legrand (West Hartford, U.S. headquarters)
- Otis Elevator^{2} (Farmington)
- Pratt & Whitney^{2} (East Hartford)
- Stanadyne (Windsor)
- Stanley Black & Decker (New Britain)
- Systematic Automation (Farmington)
- Trumpf (Farmington, U.S. headquarters)
- United Technologies (Farmington)
- Voya Financial (Windsor, home of largest office, headquarters in New York City)

^2 Division of United Technologies (Otis and Carrier are under the UTC Building & Industrial Systems division)

== Higher education ==
=== Public colleges and universities ===
Public, four-year universities in the area include:.

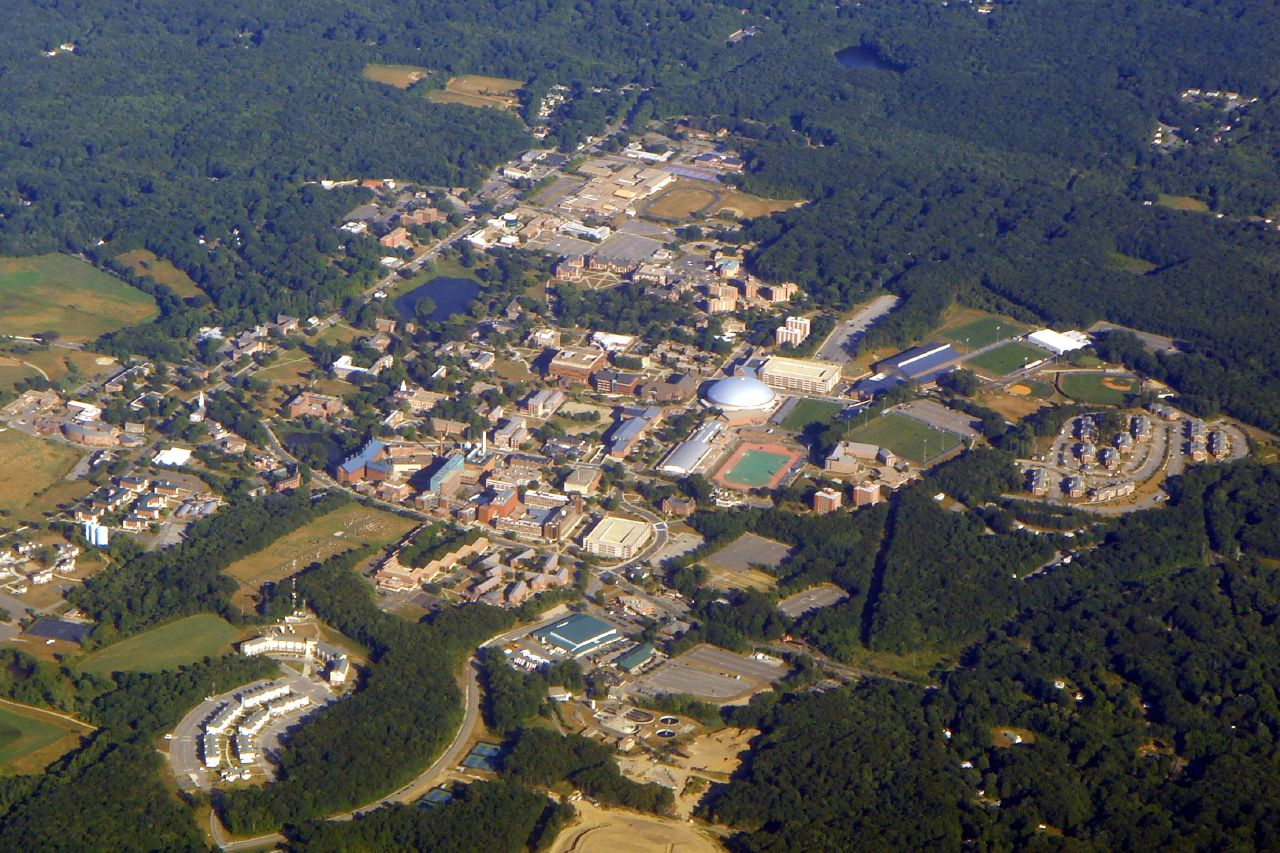
Aerial view of the UConn's main campus

- Central Connecticut State University (New Britain)
- University of Connecticut (Storrs, main campus)
  - University of Connecticut School of Dental Medicine (Farmington)
  - University of Connecticut School of Law (Hartford)
  - University of Connecticut School of Medicine (Farmington)

=== Community and technical colleges ===
Public, two-year community colleges in the area include:

- Asnuntuck Community College (Enfield)
- Capital Community College (Hartford)
- Manchester Community College (Manchester)
- Middlesex Community College (Middletown)
- Tunxis Community College (Farmington)

=== Private colleges and universities ===
Private, nonprofit, four-year universities in the area include:

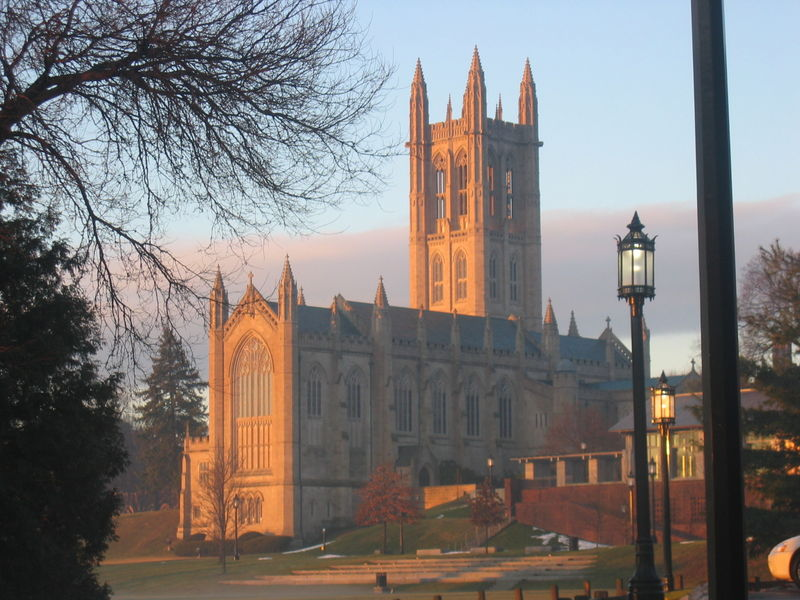
Trinity College Chapel

- Goodwin College (East Hartford)
- Hartford Seminary (Hartford)
- Rensselaer at Hartford (Hartford)
- Trinity College (Hartford)
- University of Hartford (West Hartford)
- University of Saint Joseph (West Hartford)
- Wesleyan University (Middletown)

== Healthcare ==
There are numerous hospitals in the Greater Hartford area, including five teaching hospitals (of which, one is a pediatric hospital) and two psychiatric hospitals.

=== Teaching hospitals ===
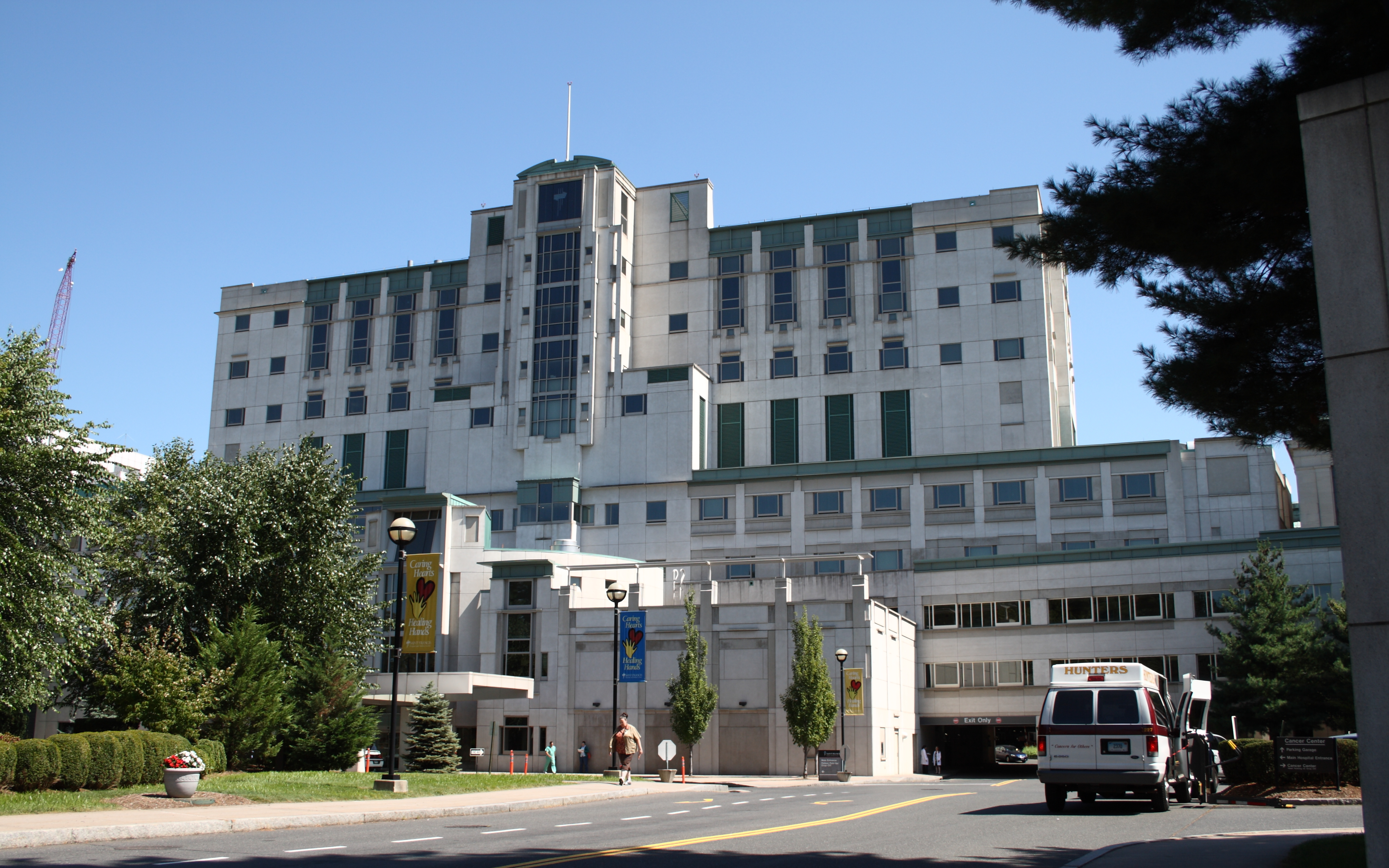
Saint Francis Hospital & Medical Center

- Connecticut Children's Medical Center (Hartford)
- Hartford Hospital (Hartford)
- The Hospital of Central Connecticut (New Britain and Southington)
- Saint Francis Hospital & Medical Center (Hartford)
- University of Connecticut Health Center, John Dempsey Hospital (Farmington)

All of the above hospitals are affiliated with the University of Connecticut School of Medicine

=== Psychiatric hospitals ===
- Connecticut Valley Hospital, owned and operated by the state of Connecticut (Middletown)
- The Institute of Living, a division of Hartford Hospital (Hartford)

== Culture and attractions ==
=== Performing arts ===
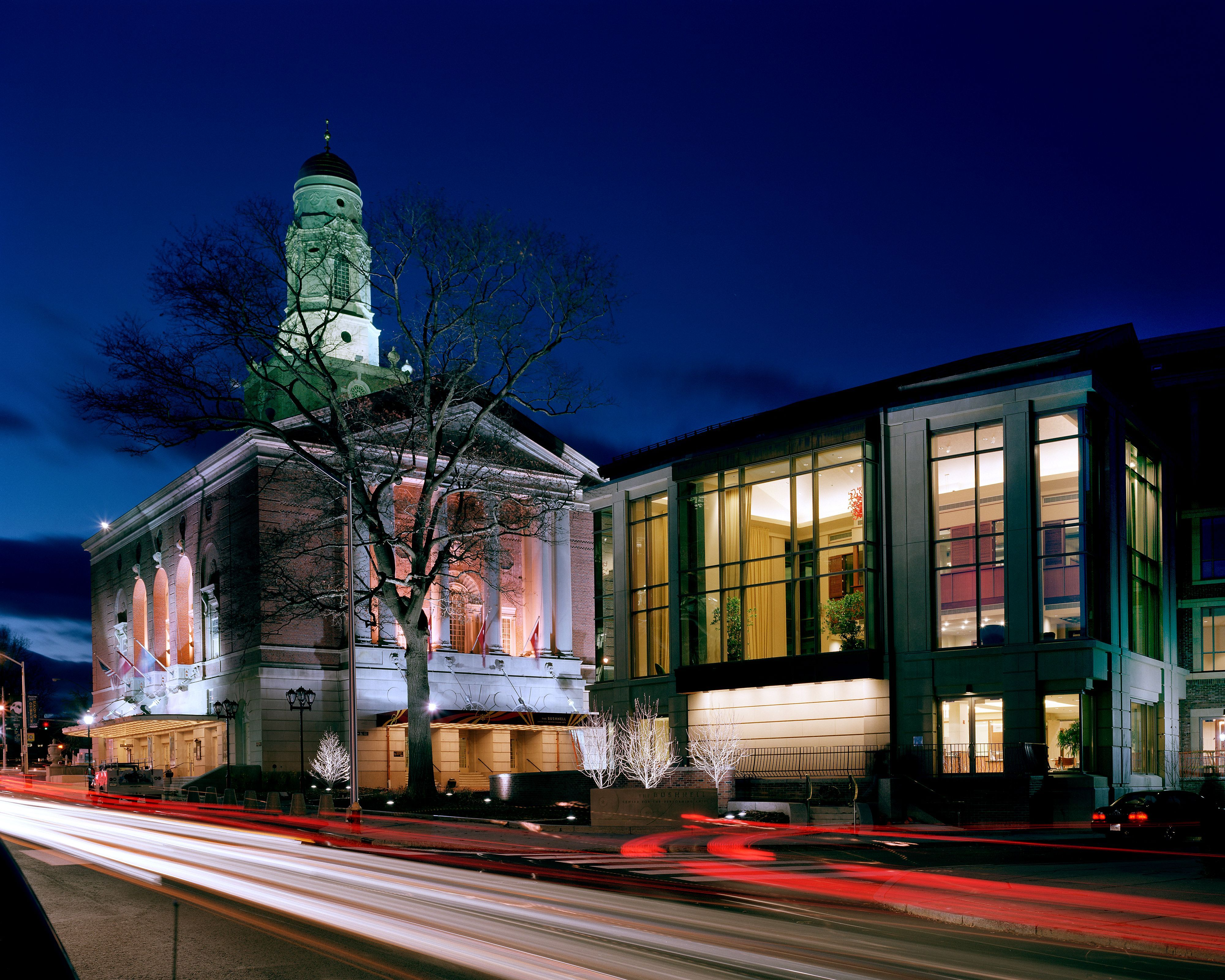
The Bushnell Center for the Performing Arts at night

The Bushnell Center for the Performing Arts is one of the largest indoor performing arts venues in the area. It houses two theaters within the complex: the 2,800-seat Mortensen Hall and the 906-seat Belding Theater, and is home to the Hartford Symphony Orchestra, the premiere orchestra in Connecticut. Other theaters in the area include the Hartford Stage and TheaterWorks.

The area is also home to the Xfinity Theatre, a 7,500-seat open-air amphitheater. The lawn outside the theater is capable of holding roughly 22,500 people, bringing total capacity to around 30,000 people.

In Hartford exurbs, the Connecticut Repertory Theatre on the main campus of the University of Connecticut in Storrs, the Goodspeed Opera House in East Haddam, and the Simsbury Meadows Performing Arts Center in Simsbury serve as pillars of the New England theatrical and performing arts scene.

=== Conventions and exhibitions ===
The Connecticut Convention Center is located in downtown Hartford adjacent to the Hartford Marriot Downtown. The facility has more than 140,000 square feet (13,000 m^{2}) of exhibition space, a 40,000-square-foot (4,000 m^{2}) ballroom, and 25,000 square feet (2,300 m^{2}) of space for meetings and conferences. Since 2005, it has hosted ConnectiCon, an annual, multi-genre, pop culture convention.

The New England Air Museum in Windsor Locks also hosts many events, with three large hangars available for use. One of the more popular events held there is FlightSimCon.

In addition, AOPA has held their annual aviation summit in Hartford.

=== Notable museums ===
- American Clock & Watch Museum (Bristol)
- Connecticut Historical Society (Hartford)
- The Children's Museum, Connecticut (West Hartford)
- Connecticut Science Center (Hartford)
- Connecticut State Library, Museum of Connecticut History (Hartford)
- Connecticut Trolley Museum (East Windsor)
- New Britain Museum of American Art (New Britain)
- New England Air Museum (Windsor Locks)
- Old State House (Hartford)
- Wadsworth Atheneum (Hartford)

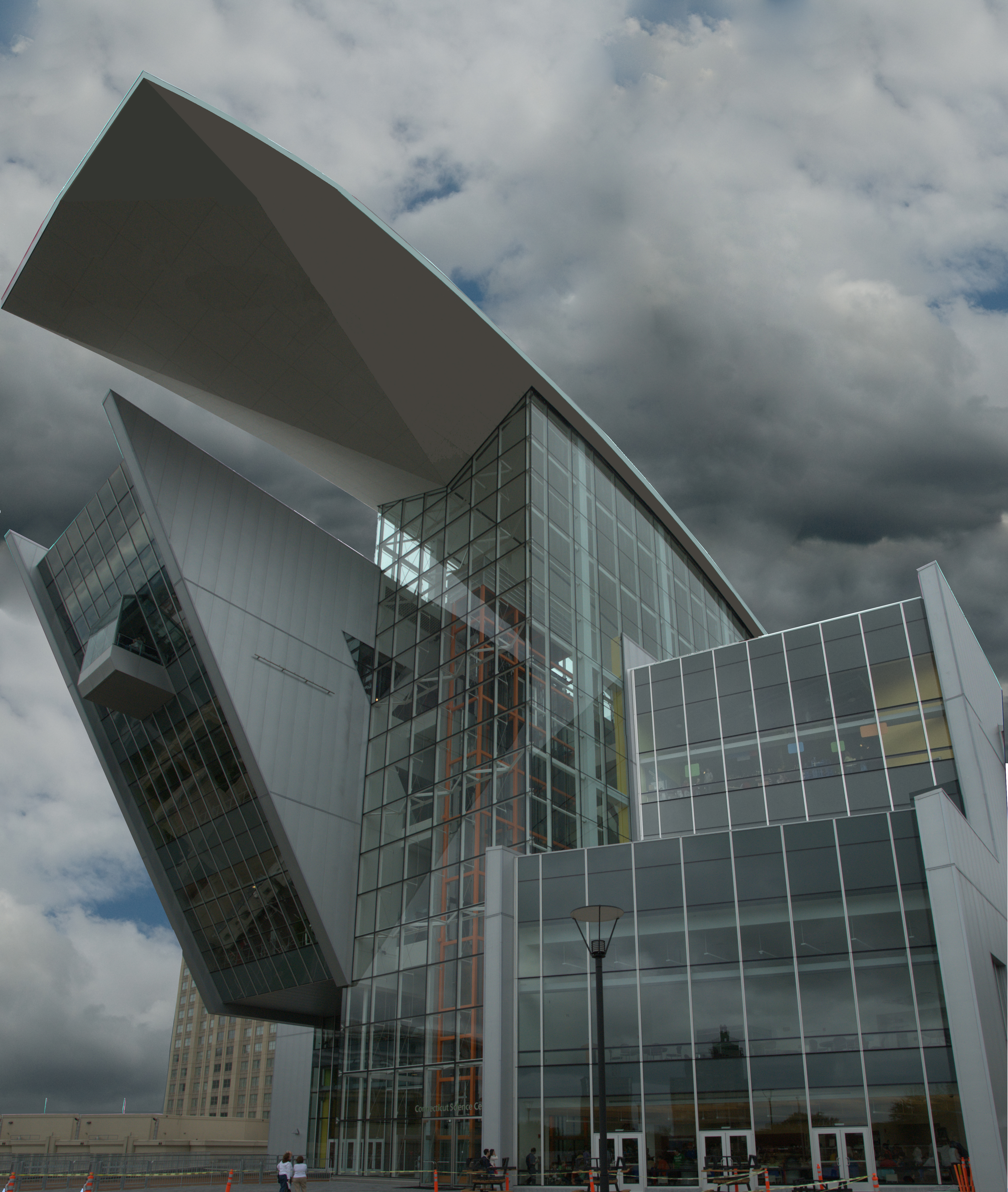
The Connecticut Science Center

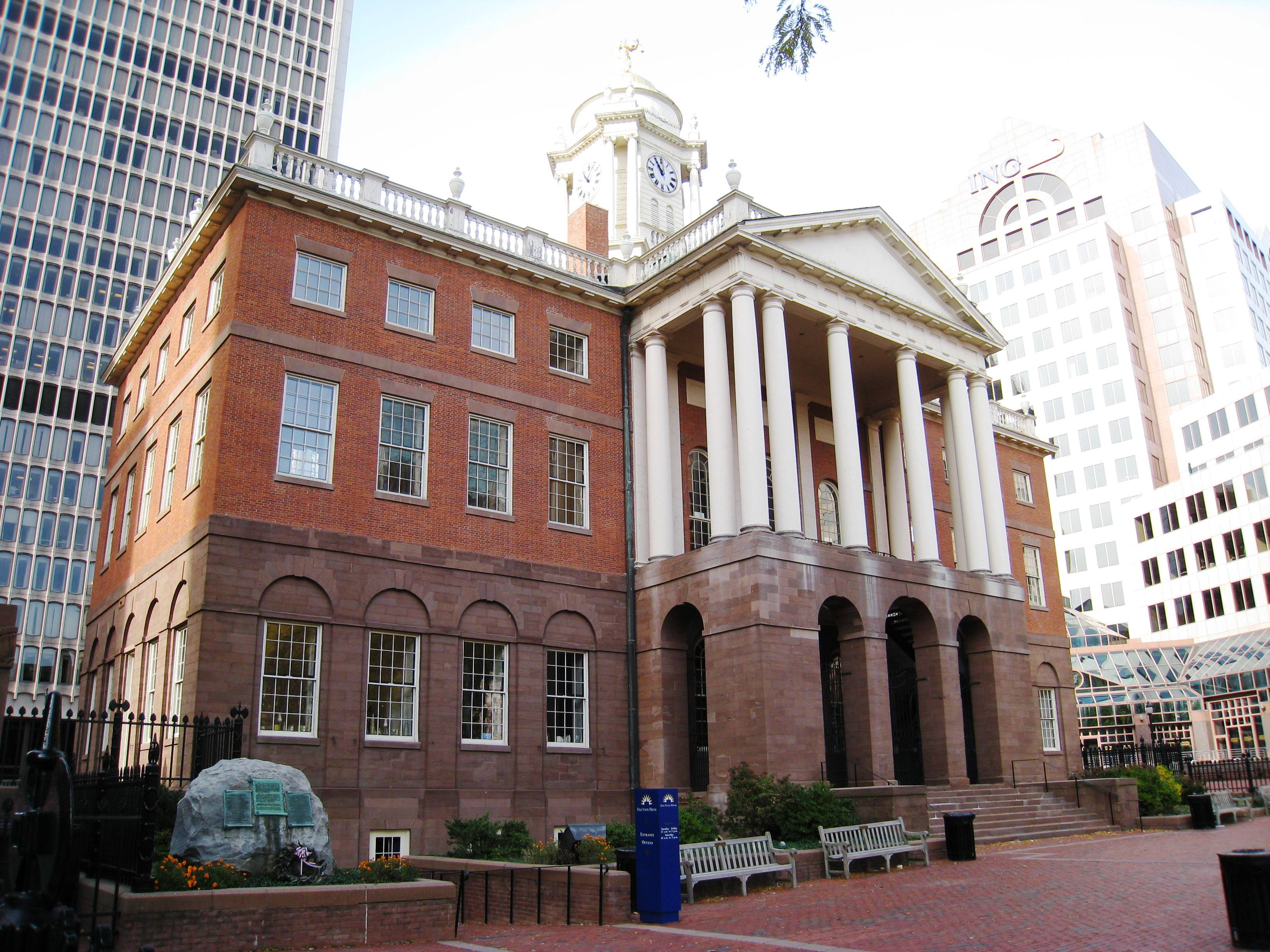
Front facade of the Old State House

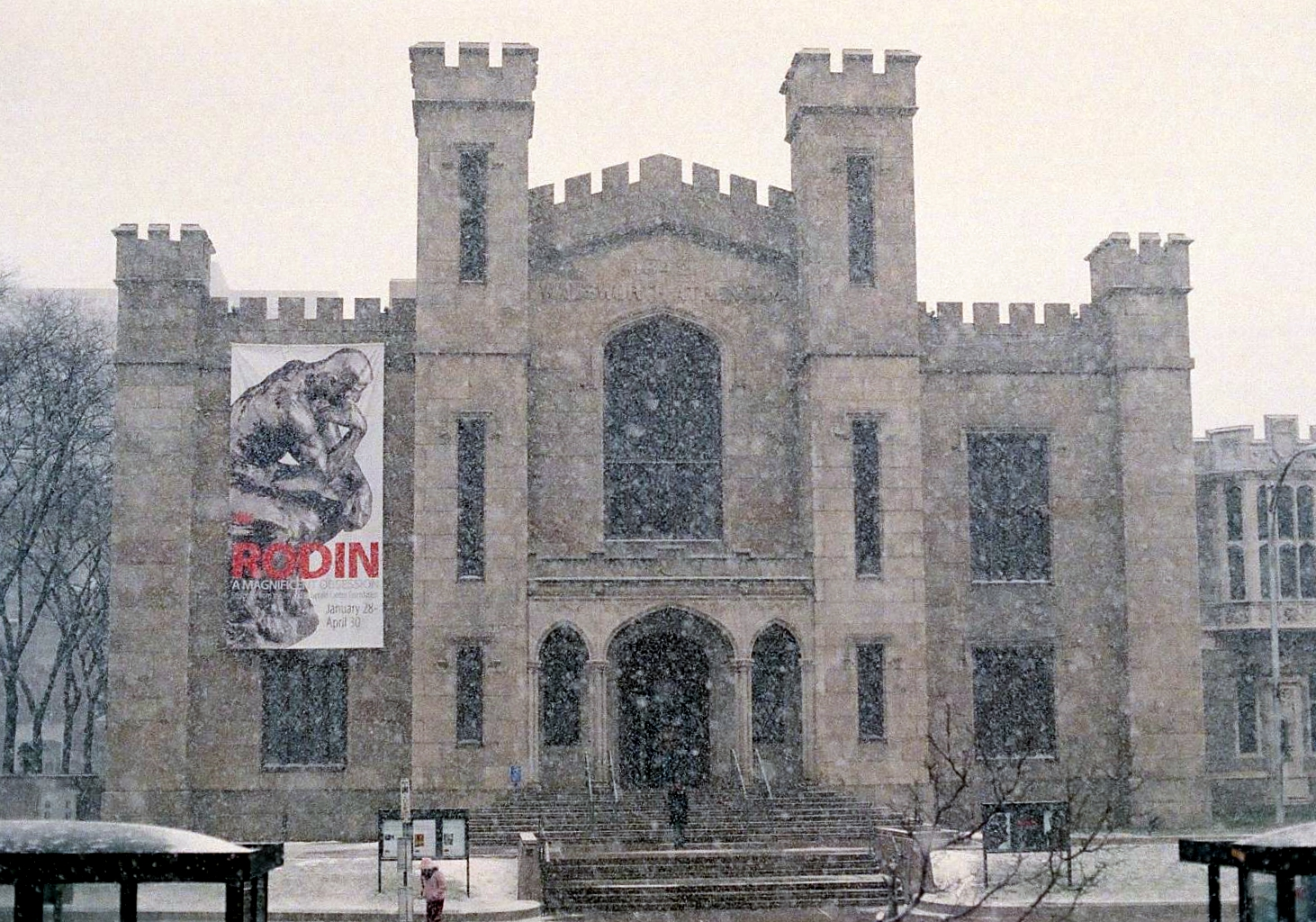
Wadsworth Atheneum in the wintertime

=== Sports ===
Greater Hartford is home to multiple minor league professional sports teams and college teams. There are currently no major league professional sports teams. However, it was home to the Hartford Whalers ice hockey team from 1974 to 1997. The Whalers came to Hartford playing in the World Hockey Association, until they were admitted to the National Hockey League in 1979. In 1997, the team relocated to North Carolina, where they were renamed the Carolina Hurricanes.

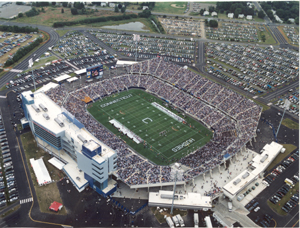
Pratt & Whitney Stadium at Rentschler Field

Throughout the mid-1990s, the New England Patriots were negotiating with the state of Connecticut for a brand new football stadium located in downtown Hartford to replace the aging Foxboro Stadium where they played. The team eventually agreed to another proposal that saw the construction of Gillette Stadium. With the Patriots no longer in the equation, the state instead decided to construct a smaller football stadium on the former United Technologies-owned airfield in East Hartford. Pratt & Whitney Stadium at Rentschler Field seats approximately 40,000 spectators and is home to the Connecticut Huskies football team.

==== Professional sports teams ====
Club	Sport	League	Venue
Hartford Wolf Pack	Ice Hockey	AHL	PeoplesBank Arena
Hartford Yard Goats	Baseball	Eastern League	Dunkin' Donuts Park
Hartford Athletic	Soccer	USL Championship	Trinity Health Stadium

==== Collegiate sports teams ====
Team	School	Division	Conference
Central Connecticut Blue Devils	Central Connecticut State University	NCAA Division I	Northeast Conference
Connecticut Huskies	University of Connecticut	NCAA Division I	Big East Conference
Hartford Hawks	University of Hartford	NCAA Division I	America East Conference
Saint Joseph Blue Jays	University of Saint Joseph	NCAA Division III	Little East Conference
Trinity Bantams	Trinity College	NCAA Division III	NESCAC
Wesleyan Cardinals	Wesleyan University	NCAA Division III	NESCAC

Greater Hartford is also home to the Travelers Championship golf tournament (formerly known as the Greater Hartford Open/Buick Championship).

=== Shopping centers ===
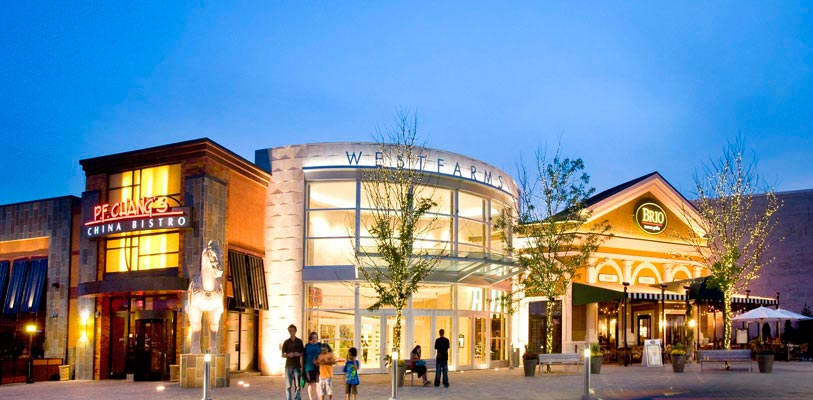
Entrance to the Westfarms Mall

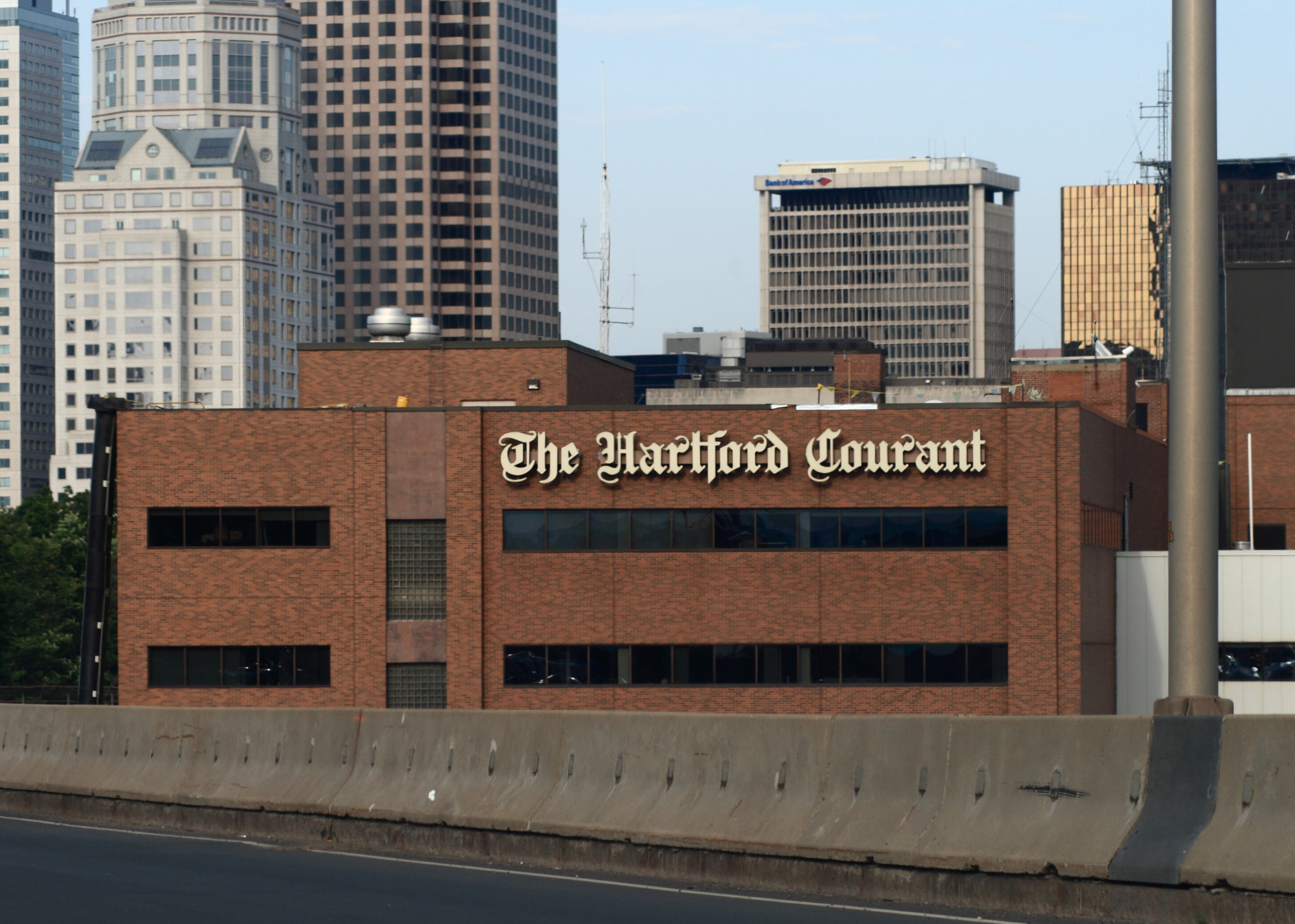
Headquarters of the Hartford Courant

Major shopping centers in the area include:

- Blue Back Square (West Hartford)
- Enfield Square Mall (Enfield)
- The Shoppes at Buckland Hills (Manchester)
- Westfarms Mall (West Hartford)

=== Media ===
==== Print ====
The Hartford Courant is the daily broadsheet newspaper serving the Greater Hartford area. Founded in 1764 as the Connecticut Courant, it is generally considered to be the oldest continually published newspaper in the United States. It is owned by Tribune Publishing.

From 1817 to 1976, the area was also served by another daily newspaper, the Hartford Times.

==== Television ====
Greater Hartford and Greater New Haven form a single television market. This television market is served by the following broadcast television stations:

===== English language =====
- WFSB (CBS)
- WTNH (ABC)
- WCCT (The CW)
- WEDH (PBS)
- WHPX (Ion Television)
- WVIT (NBC)
- WCTX (My Network TV)
- WTIC (Fox)

===== Spanish language =====
- WUVN (Univision)
- WHCT (Azteca)
- WUTH (UniMás)
- WRDM (Telemundo)

== Transportation ==
=== Road ===
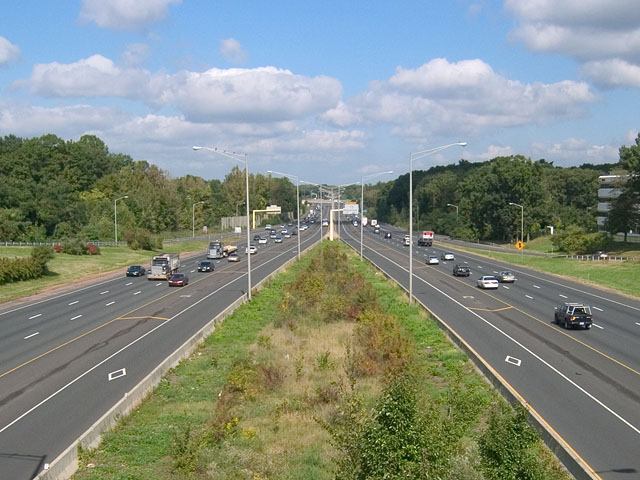
I-91 has HOV lanes in both directions between Hartford and Windsor

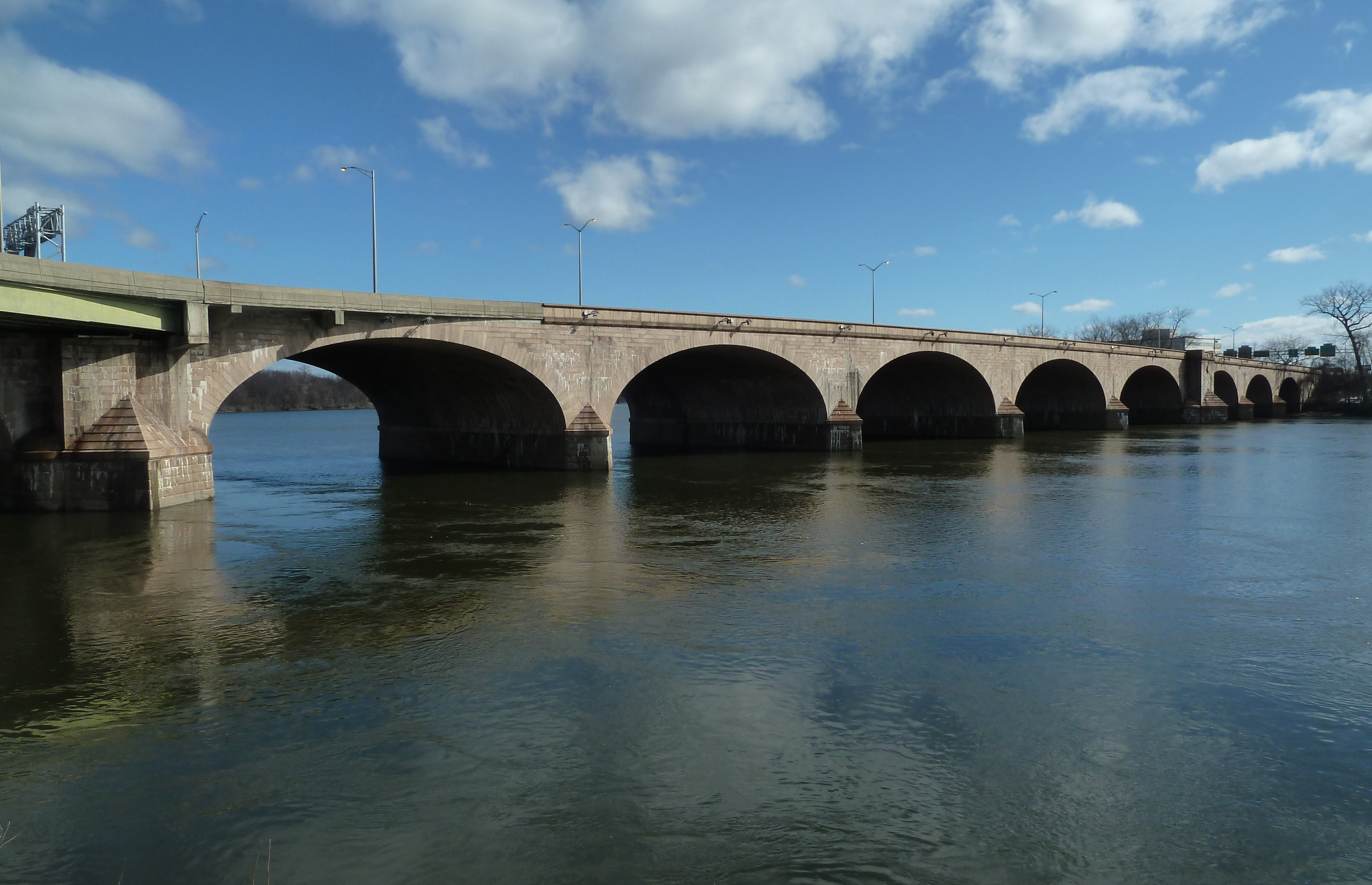
The Bulkeley Bridge carries I-84 across the Connecticut River

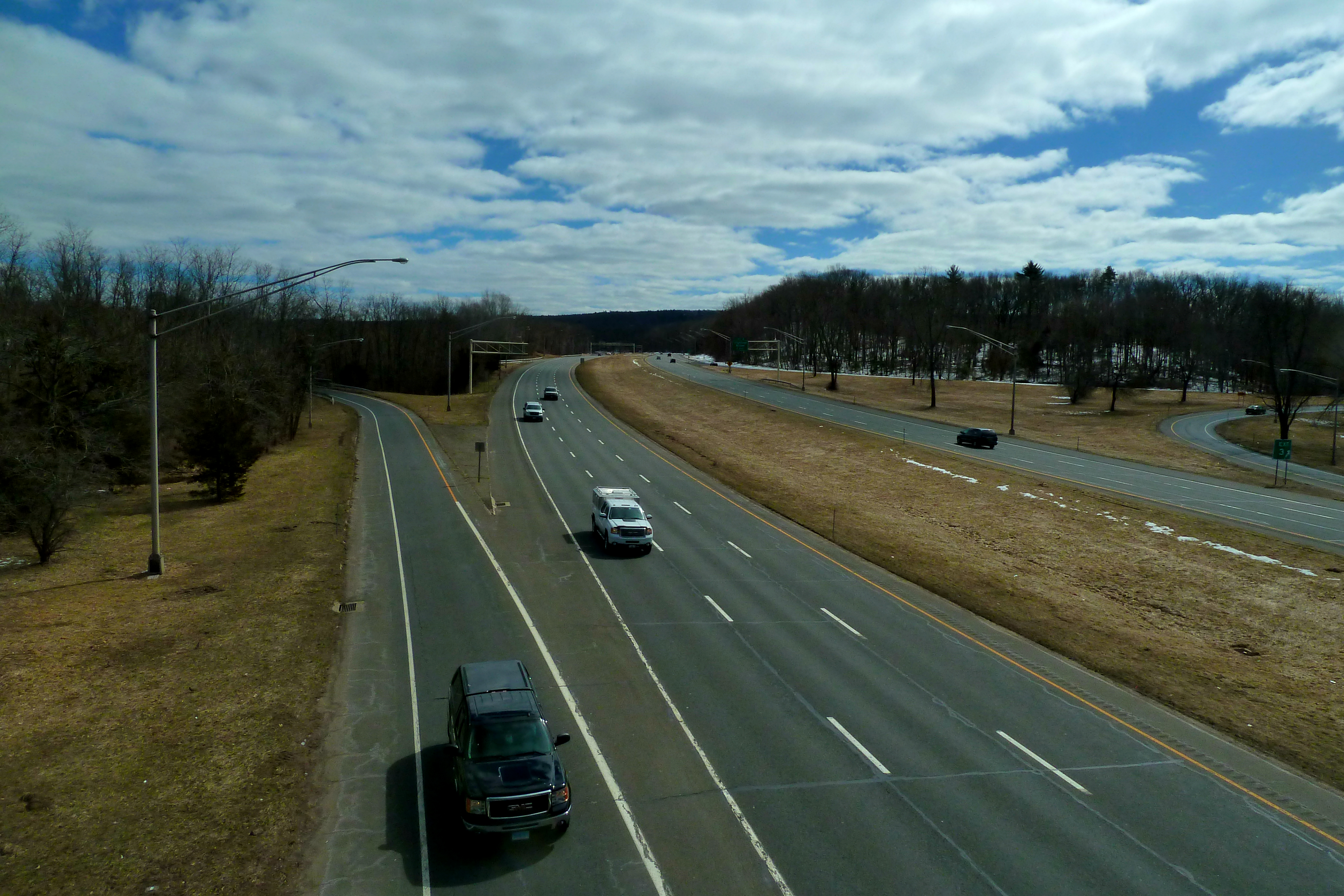
I-384 looking east from Exit 3 in Manchester, Connecticut

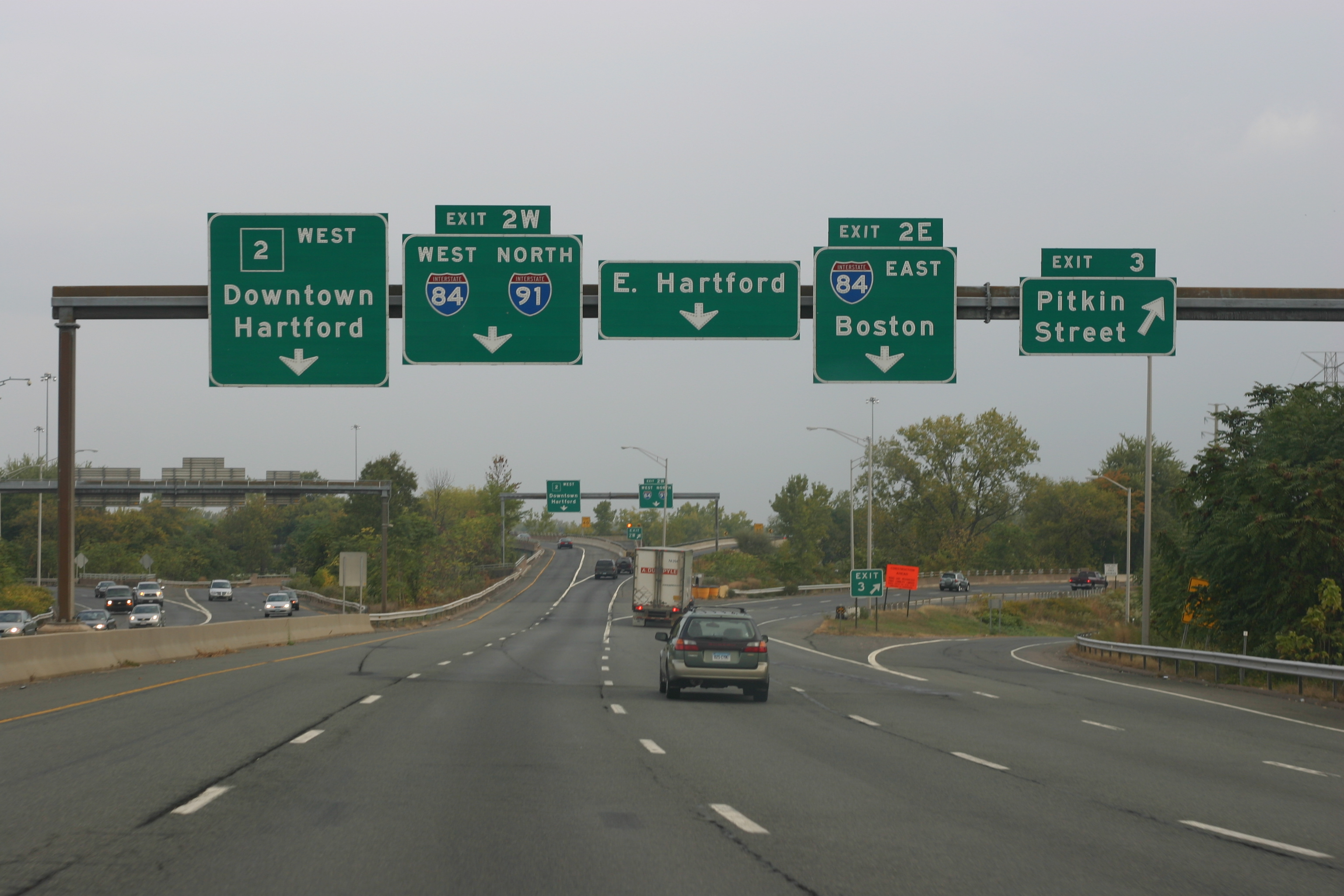
Westbound on Route 2 at its interchange with I-84

==== Interstate highways ====
Highway transportation in Greater Hartford is primarily run by two mainline Interstates:

- I-84
- I-91

There were several plans to expand the highway system (with at least one plan calling for a full beltway). Various plans encountered resistance due to budgetary and environmental concerns. However, some highways were ultimately constructed, if only partially:

- I-291 (serves as the northeastern portion of the partial beltway)
- I-384 (spur route into eastern Connecticut)
- I-691 (originally a connection to Willimantic)

==== U.S. Routes ====
In the area, four major U.S. Routes serve the area's towns/cities:

- US 5
- US 6
- US 44
- US 202

==== Other major expressways ====
Some state highways also serve as major expressways:

- Route 2
- Route 3 (initially part of the larger I-491 plan)
- Route 9 (serves as the southwestern portion of the partial beltway)
- Route 15
- Route 72

=== Bus ===
Public bus transportation is operated by the Hartford division of CTTransit. It provides service to 30 local routes and 12 express routes seven days a week throughout the metropolitan area.

2015 saw the opening of the CTfastrak, a bus rapid transit system that runs from downtown New Britain to Hartford Union Station. The dedicated busway is over 9 miles long and stops at 10 stations.

=== Airport ===
Bradley International Airport (IATA: BDL, ICAO: KBDL, FAA LID: BDL) is located in the town of Windsor Locks, approximately 10 miles from Hartford. Bradley is the second-largest airport in New England (behind Logan International Airport), and was ranked the 55th busiest airport in the United States in 2008. Southwest Airlines, Delta Air Lines, JetBlue Airways, and US Airways account for more than half of the airport's passenger traffic. The Bradley Airport Connector provides highway access to the airport from Interstate 91.

Bradley is a dual-use civil/military airport, with the Bradley Air National Guard Base serving as the home of the Connecticut Air National Guard 103d Airlift Wing.

Hartford–Brainard Airport (IATA: HFD, ICAO: KHFD, FAA LID: HFD) is a smaller reliever airport located in the southeastern section of Hartford. It is primarily used for general aviation purposes.

=== Rail ===
Several Amtrak routes run through the metropolitan area, including the Northeast Regional, Vermonter, as well as a daily shuttle between New Haven and Springfield, Massachusetts.

The Hartford Line is a commuter rail service between New Haven, Connecticut, and Springfield, Massachusetts, using the Amtrak-owned New Haven–Springfield Line. CTrail-branded trains provide service along the corridor, and riders can use Hartford Line tickets to travel on board most Amtrak trains along the corridor at the same prices. The service launched on June 16, 2018.

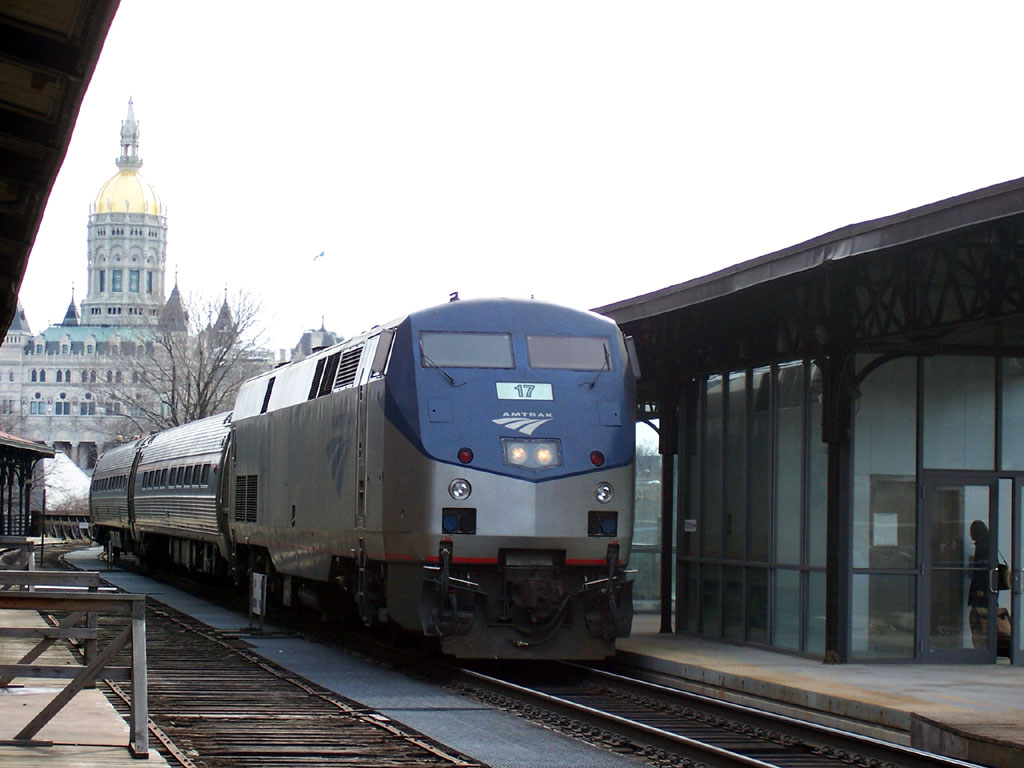
Amtrak train at Hartford Union Station

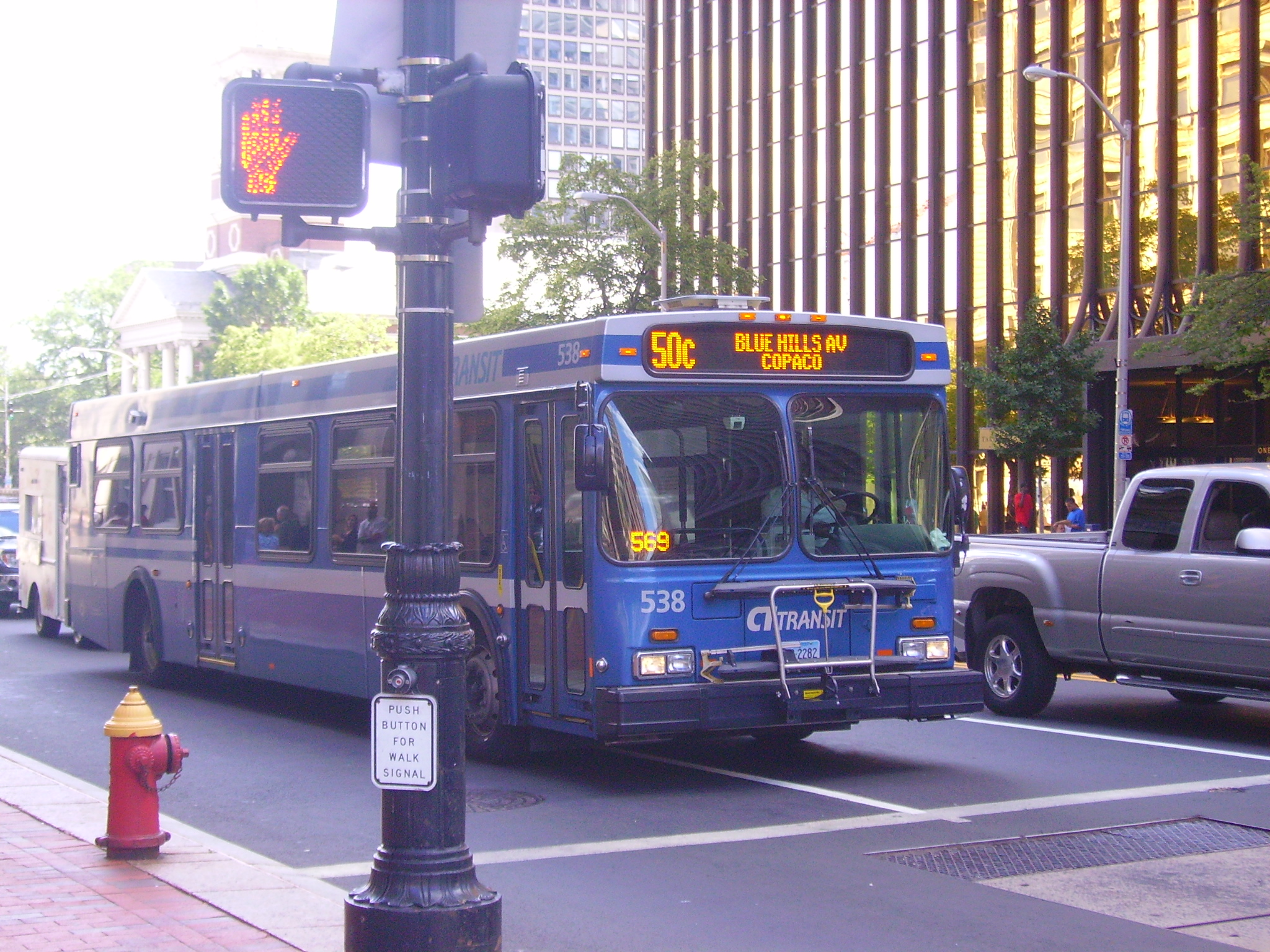
CT Transit bus on Main Street in Hartford

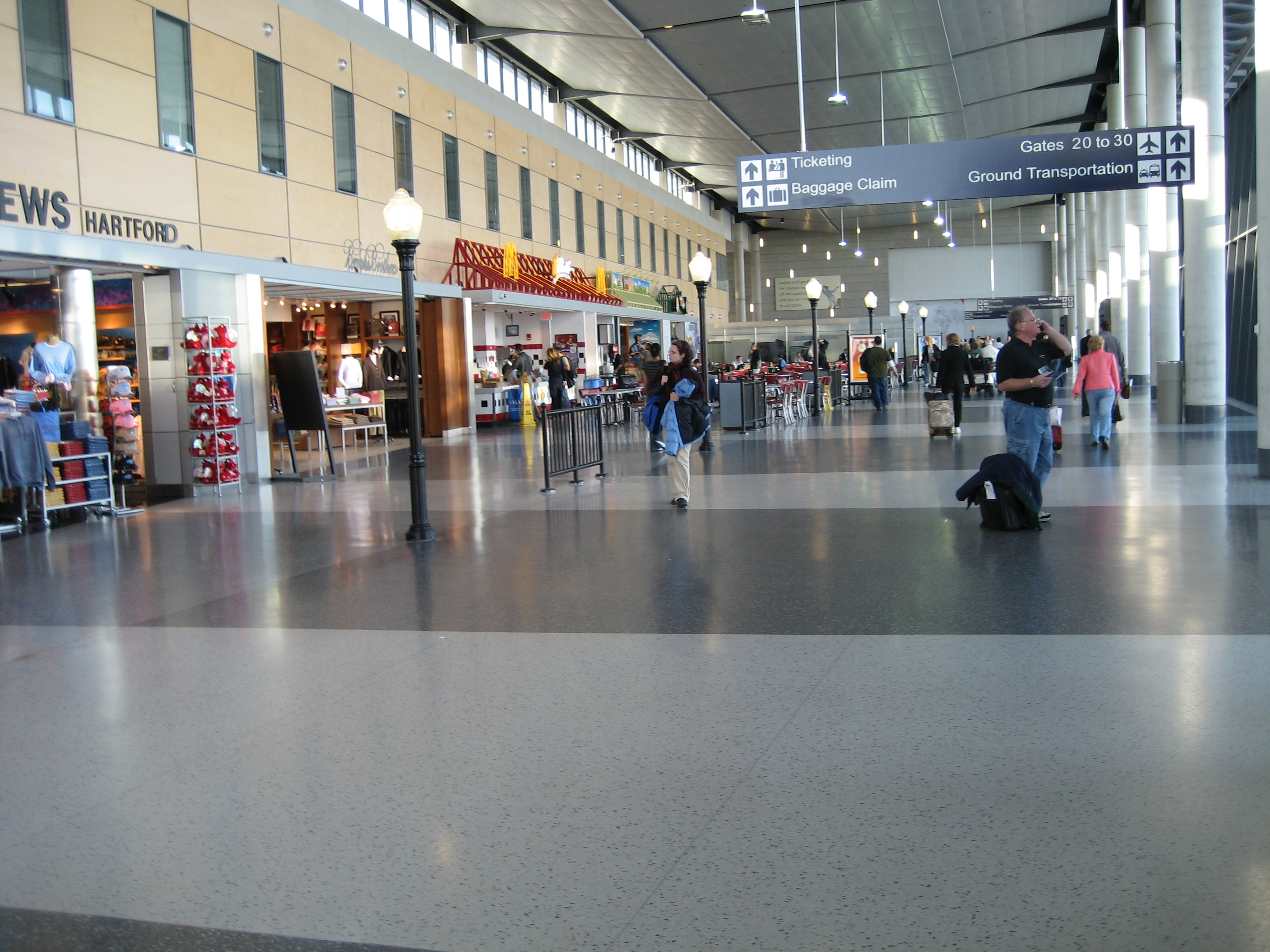
Terminal A of Bradley International Airport

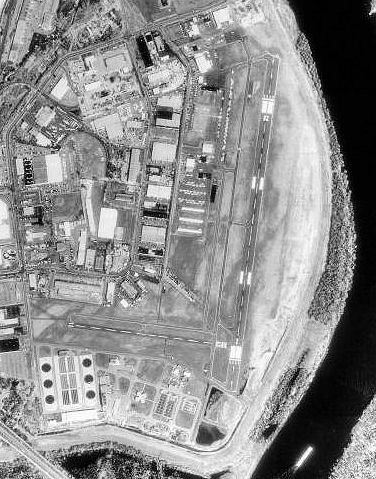
Aerial image of Hartford-Brainard Airport

== See also ==
- Connecticut statistical areas
