= Connecticut Science Center =

Coordinates: 41.7644°N 72.6697°W

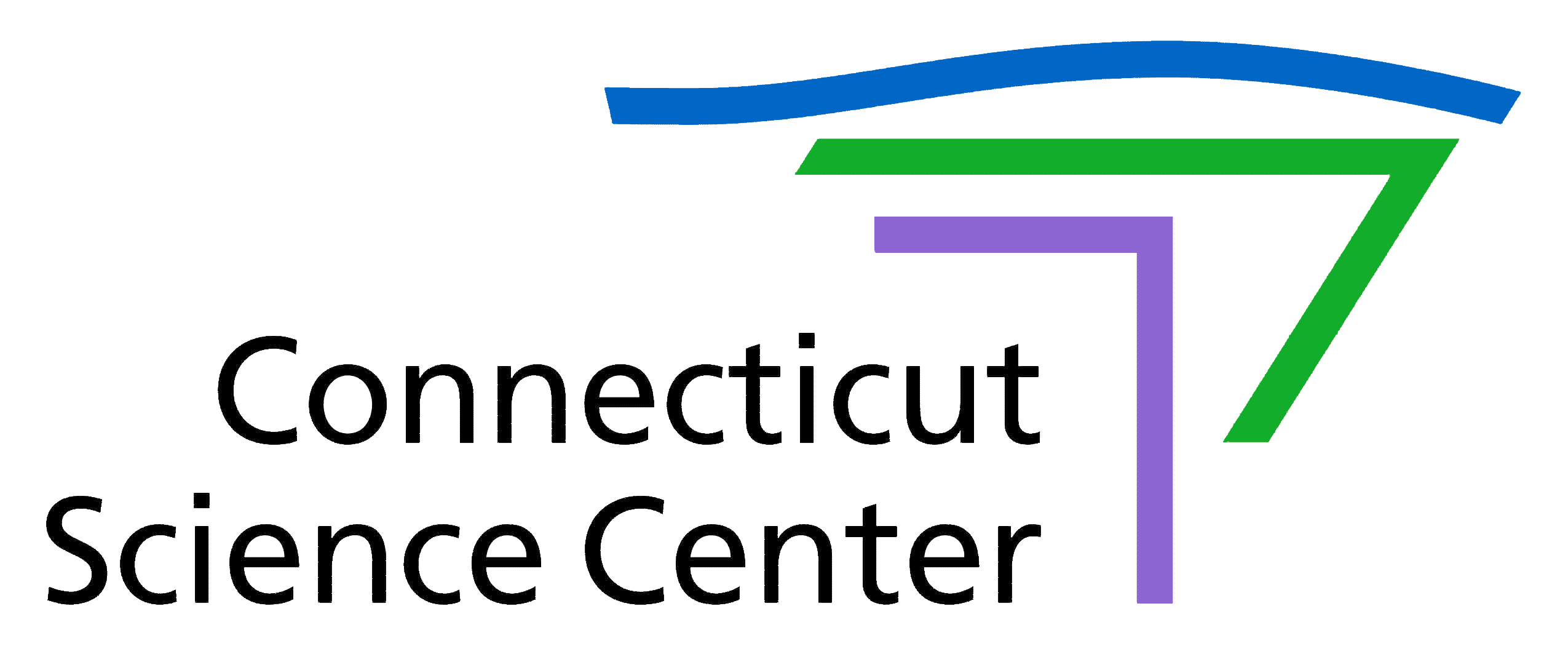

- Connecticut Science Center (2026)
- Established: 2009
- Location: 250 Columbus Boulevard; Hartford, Connecticut, United States
- Type: Science museum
- Public transit access: 906, 907, 910, 919, 921, 950, CB
- Website: ctsciencecenter.org

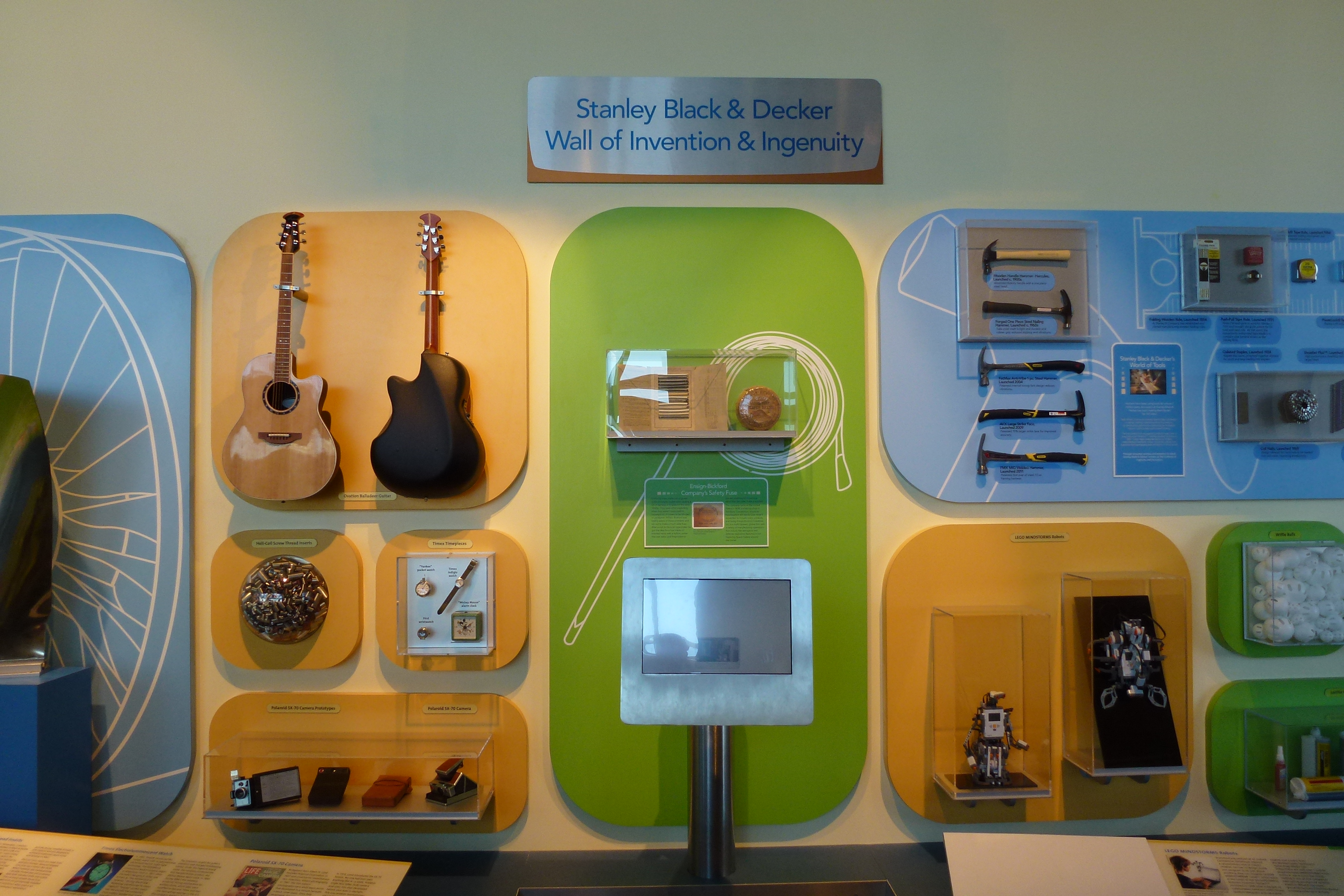
Items invented in CT on the Wall of Invention and Ingenuity

The Connecticut Science Center is a nine-story museum located on the Connecticut River in Hartford, Connecticut designed by César Pelli & Associates, which opened on June 12, 2009. The building measures a total of 154,000 square feet (14,300 m^{2}), including 40,000 square feet (3,700 m^{2}) of interactive exhibits consisting of videos, audios, visuals, tactile components, programs, and live demonstrations.

== Development ==
Planning for the Connecticut Science Center began in 2001. The Science Center's goals are to promote the study of science by the state's youth and to encourage urban revitalization in Hartford. The state of Connecticut provided more than $100 million of support for the $165 million museum, and the balance was donated by businesses, foundations and individuals.

The Connecticut Science Center is the first science center to generate most of its needed power from an on-site fuel cell. This step was a major one for the Connecticut Science Center and a step towards being a Gold Level LEED Certified green building. The 200-kilowatt fuel cell, built by UTC Power (a United Technologies Corp business based in South Windsor), generates 100 percent of the electricity the Science Center uses. The PureCell System is fueled with natural gas, and does not use combustion. Instead, the fuel gas undergoes an electrochemical process that produces direct current electricity, heat, and water. Carbon dioxide gas is also released, as an undesirable byproduct of the fuel cell operation.

== Maximilian E. and Marion O. Hoffman Foundation Science Theater ==
A stadium-seating-style theater that houses over 200 people, it has a 30-by-40-foot (9.1 m × 12.2 m) screen, an 18,000-watt Dolby sound system, and utilizes Dolby 3D technology and glasses.

== See also ==
- List of museums in Connecticut
