= PureCell System =

Stationary phosphoric acid fuel cell

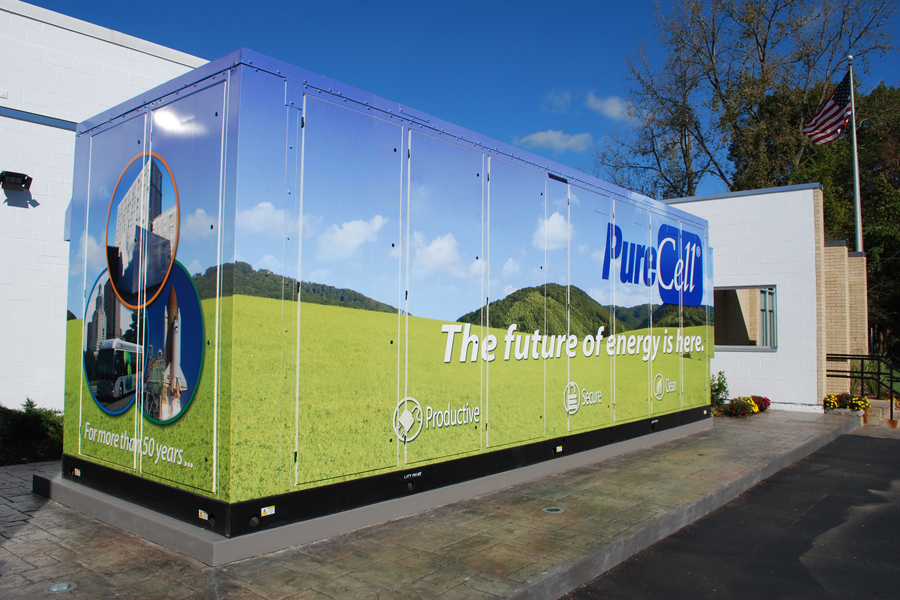
Doosan Fuel Cell 400kW fuel cell

The PureCell System is a stationary phosphoric acid fuel cell designed, manufactured and marketed by Doosan Fuel Cell America (formerly ClearEdge Power/UTC Power) of South Windsor, Connecticut. Designed for distributed generation and micro combined heat and power applications, it is intended for industrial buildings such as hotels, hospitals, data centers, supermarkets, and educational institutions. PureCell System says that its users will see lower energy costs, reduced emissions, 95% system efficiency, 10-year cell stack durability and 20-year product life.

It uses a combustion-free process with natural gas and converts heat exhaust into cooling and heating, turning potential waste into useful energy.

== Installations ==
On August 17, 2011, it was announced that the PureCell Model 400 system fleet had reached 200,000 hours of field operation. In September 2013, ClearEdge Power announced that its 400-kW stationary fuel cell surpassed 1,000,000 hours of field operation. Today, PureCell Model 400 system fleet has over 12 million hours of field operation.

ClearEdge Power’s chief operating officer Joe Triompo said that PureCell System repeat customers include The Coca-Cola Company, Cox Communications, and Whole Foods Market.

Other customers include First National Bank of Omaha, Price Chopper Supermarkets, 4 Times Square, Shaw's, GS Power Co./Samsung, St. Helena Hospital, the World Trade Center, The Octagon, New Haven City Hall, South Windsor High School, 360 State Street, Albertsons, the University of Connecticut Diversey, Inc., and Eastern Connecticut State University.
