= New Haven City Hall and County Courthouse =

- U.S. National Register of Historic Places
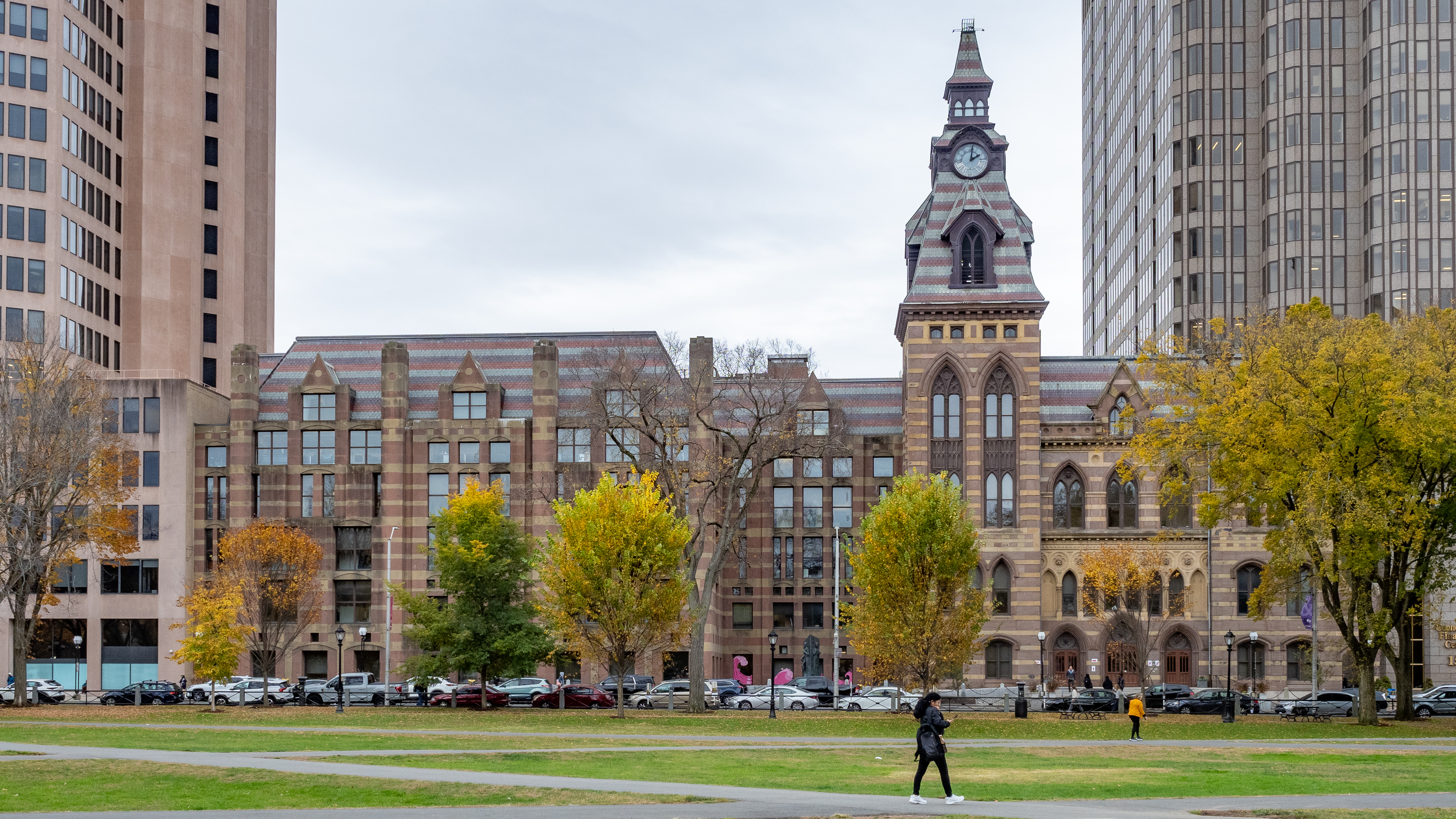
- New Haven City Hall & County Courthouse

- Location within Connecticut Location within the United States
- Location: 161 Church Street, New Haven, Connecticut
- Coordinates: 41°18′26″N 72°55′29″W
- Area: 2 acres (0.81 ha)
- Built: 1861; 1871–73
- Architect: Henry Austin; David R. Brown
- Architectural style: High Victorian Gothic
- NRHP reference No.: 75001940
- Added to NRHP: September 9, 1975

Header

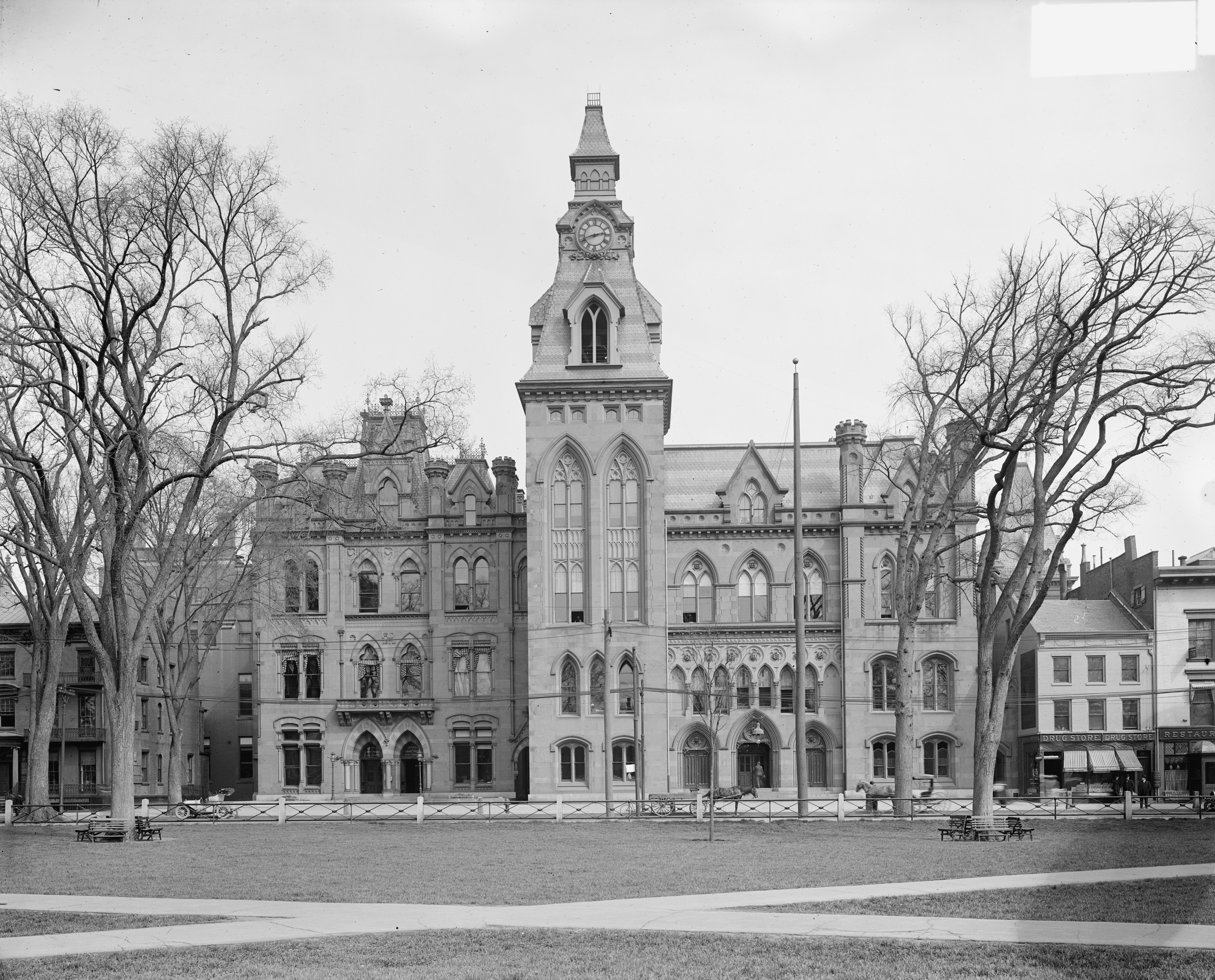
Exterior, ca. 1900-1915

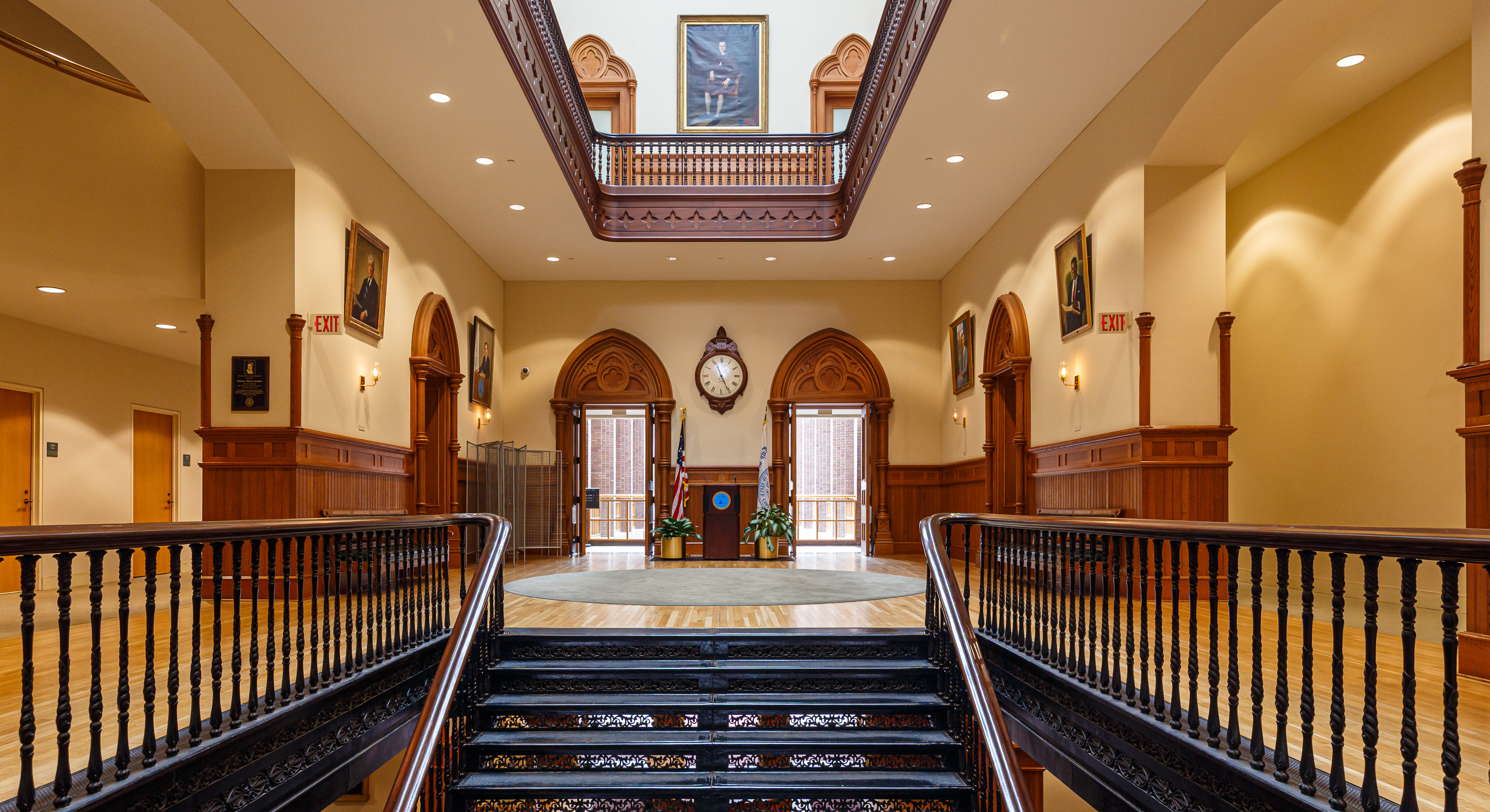
Interior, 2025

The New Haven City Hall and County Courthouse is located at 161 Church Street in the Downtown section of New Haven, Connecticut. The city hall building, designed by Henry Austin, was built in 1861; the old courthouse building, now an annex, was built in 1871–73. They stand on the east side of the New Haven Green.

The pair of buildings was listed on the U.S. National Register of Historic Places in 1975. They are significant early examples of High Victorian Gothic architecture in the United States.

== History ==
New Haven’s city hall was designed by New Haven architect Henry Austin and completed in 1861. In 1873, the county courthouse was constructed on the left (north) side of the building, designed by David R. Brown. In 1914 the courthouse moved nearby and the older building became an annex for City Hall.

Brownstone from Portland, Connecticut and from Nova Scotia were used in construction to give the building a colorful effect. However, the materials were difficult to maintain, and the building was badly deteriorating by the mid 20th Century. The building's ornate clock tower was demolished in the 1950s. By the 1970s, the City Hall and courthouse were slated for demolition. In 1976, much of the rear and north portions of the original structure were demolished; due to local preservation groups, the facade was saved and the clock tower and rebuilt.

In 1992, a memorial to those involved in the Amistad incident, the Amistad memorial, was erected in front of city hall, facing the New Haven Green, as this was the site of the prison where the Africans aboard the Amistad were held and tried.

=== Fuel cell ===
In January 2012, a PureCell Model 400 was dropped into place behind City Hall in the Millennium Plaza. The heat produced by the fuel cell will be used to heat and cool City Hall and the Hall of Records. It will supply 60 percent of the buildings' heating needs, and 30 percent of cooling needs. According to Giovanni Zinn of the city's Office of Sustainability, the PureCell can help the city save up to $1 million in energy costs over the next ten years.

=== Renovation ===
In 2023, a renovation and expansion to City Hall was announced. The project was estimated to cost $6.2 million, and add 6,800 square feet to the building.

== See also ==
- National Register of Historic Places listings in New Haven, Connecticut
