= UTC Power =

American fuel cell manufacturing company

- Company type: Former Subsidiary of UTC
- Industry: Fuel cell
- Founded: 1958 (under Pratt & Whitney for NASA's Apollo missions)
- Headquarters: South Windsor, Connecticut

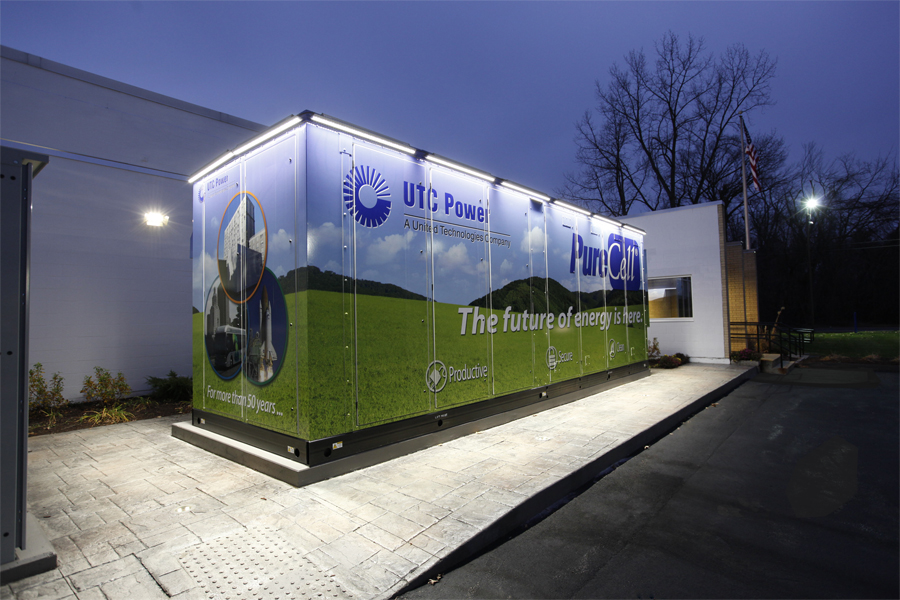
Nighttime picture of the onsite PureCell® System Model 400 at 195 Governor's Highway in South Windsor, Connecticut

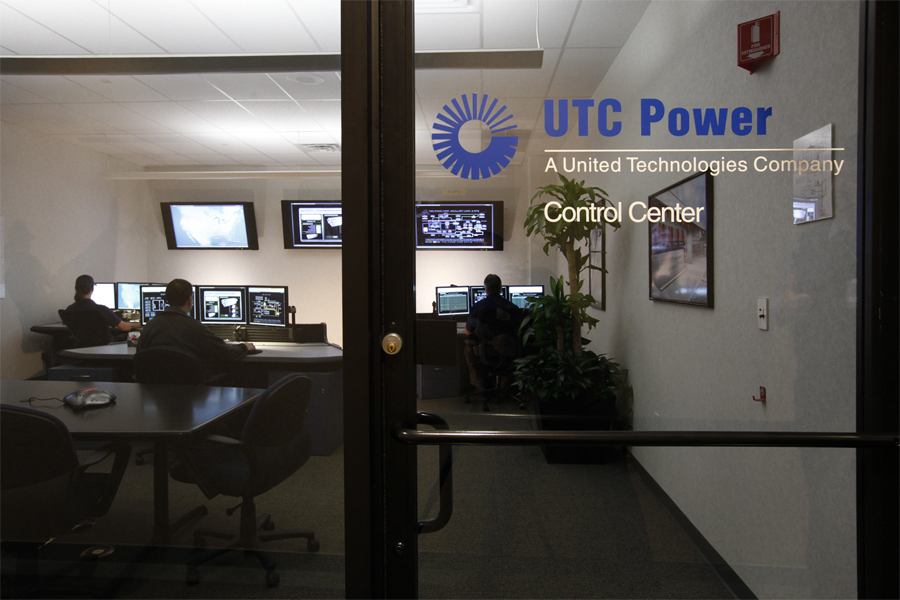
UTC Power's Control Center located onsite at 195 Governor's Highway in South Windsor, CT

UTC Power was a fuel cell company based in South Windsor, Connecticut. It was part of United Technologies Corporation; it was purchased by ClearEdge Power in February 2013. The company specialized in fuel cells for buildings, buses and automobiles. It has also developed fuel cells for space and submarine applications in the past.

== History ==
UTC Power began as a division of Pratt & Whitney in 1958. In 1966, the company supplied fuel cells to NASA for the Apollo project space missions, to supply electric power and drinking water for the astronauts on board and, later, for the Space Shuttle missions until 2010. In 1985, the company became a wholly owned subsidiary of UTC under the name International Fuel Cells. It was later renamed UTC Fuel Cells in 2001, and became UTC Power in 2004.

In the early 1990s, UTC Power commercialized a large, stationary fuel cell for use as a cogeneration power plant. The company has expanded into the broader fuel cell industry over the last 10 years, developing fuel cells for automobiles and buses.

In February 2013, UTC Power was sold to ClearEdge Power.

== Fuel cells for buildings ==
UTC Power’s stationary phosphoric acid fuel cell product is the PureCell Model 400 System. This stationary fuel cell system provides 400 kilowatts of electricity and 1.7 million Btu/hour of heat. The PureCell System is considered a good match for combined heat and power applications including supermarkets, hospitals, hotels and educational institutions. The UTC Power fuel cell system uses natural gas which is converted in a "catalytic reformer" into hydrogen, carbon dioxide, carbon monoxide, and water. The hydrogen is used to run the four fuel cell stacks to produce electricity and the power plant then converts the exhaust heat into cooling and heating, turning potential waste into usable energy. The product has a 10-year cell stack durability and 20-year product life.

UTC Power has designed, manufactured and installed more than 300 stationary fuel cells in 19 countries on six continents. The fleet has exceeded 9.4 million hours of field operation and has generated more than 1.6 billion kWh of energy, enough to power nearly 140,000 homes for an entire year. PureCell Systems are operating at Whole Foods Markets in California, Connecticut, Massachusetts; Price Chopper stores in New York, a Coca-Cola Refreshments bottling facility in New York and another in Connecticut, a powerplant in South Korea, and at other sites around the world.

== Fuel cells for buses ==
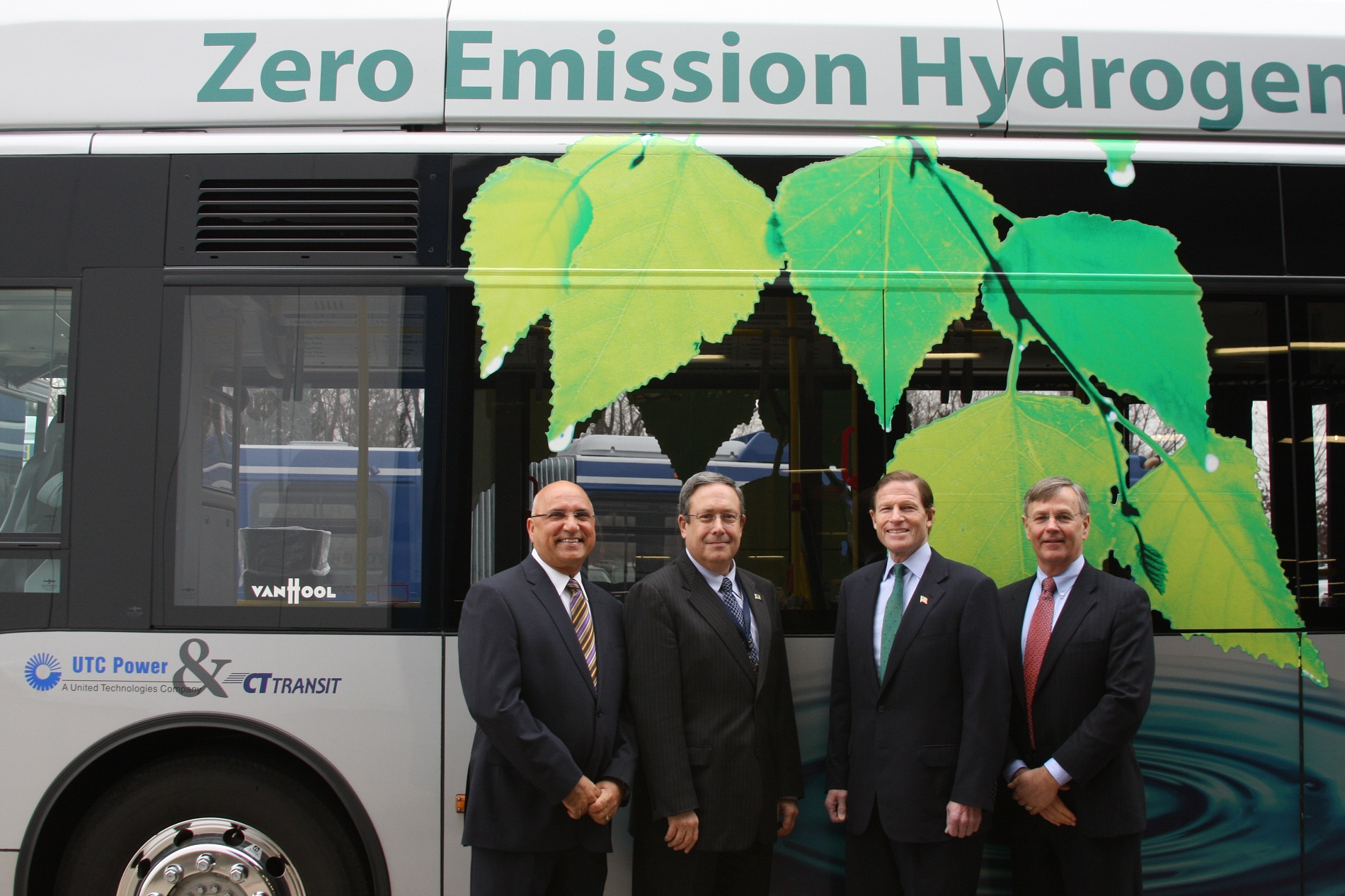
(left to right) Joe Triompo, VP and General Manager, UTC Power; David Lee, General Manager, CT TRANSIT; Senator Blumenthal; James Redeker, Commissioner, CT DOT.

The PureMotion Model 120 System was UTC Power’s zero-emission proton exchange membrane (PEM) fuel cell for transit buses. UTC Power’s PureMotion Model 120 system is powering a fleet of transit buses in Connecticut and California.

On Friday, March 16, 2012, UTC Power participated in an event hosted by Senator Richard Blumenthal (D-CT) to highlight U.S. Senate passage of federal surface transportation legislation. The event was held at CT Transit facilities in Hartford and included representatives from the Connecticut Department of Transportation. On Tuesday, the U.S. Senate passed a two-year reauthorization of federal highway, transit and safety programs to fund highway and transit improvements nationwide. The legislation included a Clean Fuels Grant Program to prioritize funding for transit agencies to purchase zero emission passenger buses.

== Fuel cells for automobiles ==
UTC Power developed and manufactured PEM fuel cells for automobiles. The company worked with BMW, Hyundai and Nissan as well as the U.S. Department of Energy on development and demonstration programs.

== Energy Security ==
The UTC Power Control Center monitored the global fleet of PureCell systems 24/7 and often detected potential problems before they could impact successful operation of the system, ensuring maximum uptime for customers. Each PureCell included an internet-based communication system, called the Remote Monitoring System (RMS). The RMS provided the Control Center with remote access to fuel cell operating data and allowed limited control, including start-up, power output kW set point and shut-down commands. The fuel cell could independently “call out” to alert technicians of out-of-limit parameters, status, and need for maintenance. The RMS also supplied the system owner with website access to view the fuel cell’s operating status.
