= HyAxiom =

Doosan Fuel Cell America, Inc.
- Company type: Subsidiary
- Industry: Alternative energy
- Founded: 2014
- Headquarters: South Windsor, Connecticut, USA; 37.38201°N 122.00848°W
- Key people: Jeff Hyungrak Chung, President and CEO
- Products: Fuel cells
- Parent: Doosan Group
- Website: www.doosanfuelcellamerica.com/en/

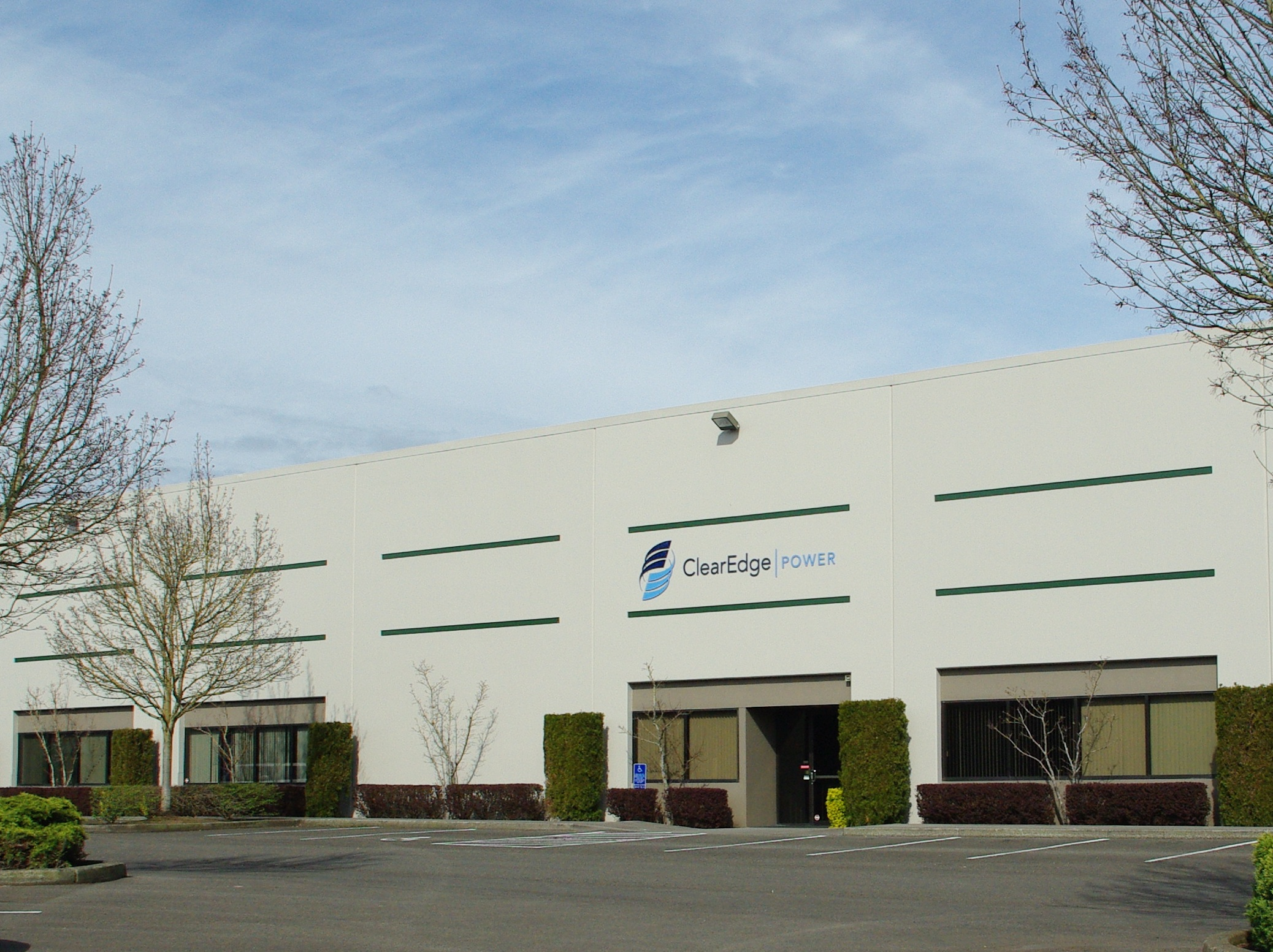
Headquarters of the former ClearEdge Power, Hillsboro, Oregon

ClearEdge Power, Inc. was a fuel cell manufacturer focusing on the stationary fuel cell. It was headquartered in South Windsor, Connecticut, U.S. The company employed 225 people as of August 2011. It closed its operations in Connecticut in April 2014, and filed for Chapter 11 bankruptcy protection in May 2014. The company's assets were purchased out of bankruptcy by Doosan Fuel Cell America, Inc.

== History ==
ClearEdge Power, Inc. was founded in 2003 as Quantum Leap Technology by Ed Davis and after Brett Vinsant and Ed Davis created the company's fuel cell in their garages in Hillsboro, Oregon. In August 2005, Quantum Leap changed its name to ClearEdge Power. In January 2006, they received a $2 million investment from a subsidiary of Applied Materials. At that time the company built fuel cell systems to produce back-up power and for continuous power applications. By May 2007, the company had grown to 20 employees and had raised $10 million in venture capital. In early 2008, ClearEdge sold and installed its first fuel cell unit.

ClearEdge received an additional $11 million in venture capital from Kohlberg Ventures LLC in January 2009. On May 1, 2009, Russell Ford became the chief executive officer of the then 40-employee company, with Slangerup joining the board of directors.

The company expanded the 55,000-square-foot (5,100 m^{2}) headquarters to 80,000 square feet (7,400 m^{2}) in December 2009 after receiving an additional $15 million in venture capital from Kohlberg Ventures. At that time the company had grown to 150 employees, and 95% of all capital raised came from Kohlberg Ventures. ClearEdge raised a total of $29 million from Kohlberg in 2009 alone. In November 2009, the company began to ship a five kilowatt fuel cell and had orders for 300 of the units by December 2009. ClearEdge gained $11 million more in private financing in January 2010.

In February 2010, a fuel cell was installed at a Hillsboro Fire Department station; local dignitaries included Congressman David Wu. Wu’s district includes ClearEdge’s headquarters in Hillsboro, and Wu sponsored several bills that would provide tax credits for fuel cell customers. ClearEdge backed one of the bills, which would increase the federal tax credit for installing a fuel cell at a residence to be same as for businesses. Neither of Wu's bills made it out of committee.

ClearEdge signed a $40 million deal in June 2010 to supply 800 fuel cells to Korean based LS Industrial Systems over a three-year period. LS Industrial Systems would sell the ClearEdge5 units in Korea, which had recently required 10 percent of power on new construction come from renewable power. This was the first large contract for the company outside of its core California market. The company planned to build 1,000 units in 2010, and double that in 2011. ClearEdge was awarded a $2.8 million federal Department of Energy grant that would allow them to provide 38 fuel cells to ten different organizations including a grocery store and community college. They raised $73.5 million in private equity funding in August 2011 to help expand sales to Europe and South Korea.

In December 2012, ClearEdge reached an agreement with United Technologies Corp. to buy its fuel cell business, UTC Power. In February 2013, ClearEdge closed on its acquisition of UTC Power. The next month, the company reduced its workforce by 39%, with many layoffs coming at the former UTC unit. Later that month the company announced it had raised another $36 million in capital. In 2013, the company relocated its headquarters to Sunnyvale, California. The former UTC unit in Connecticut was then closed without warning in April 2014 as the company weighed filing for bankruptcy protection.

In July 2014, ClearEdge was purchased out of bankruptcy by Doosan Fuel Cell America, Inc. for 32.4 million, plus debt.

== Operations ==
Doosan Fuel Cell America, Inc.'s headquarters are in South Windsor, Connecticut. The main product is a four hundred kilowatt fuel cell.

The fuel cell is powered by natural gas which a membrane breaks down into water, heat, carbon dioxide (CO_{2}), and hydrogen, with the latter passing through a second membrane where electricity is generated. The micro combined heat and power fuel cell have approximately 85% total fuel efficiency. PEM fuel systems have an electric efficiency of about 60% .

== See also ==
- Emergency power system
