= Papworth =

Papworth may refer to:

- Manor of Papworth, Ripley, Surrey, England
- Papworth Everard, a village in Cambridgeshire, England
  - Papworth Hospital, a heart and lung hospital in Papworth Everard
    - Papworth method, a diaphragmatic breathing technique developed at Papworth Hospital
  - Papworth Industries, the manufacturing arm of Papworth Village Settlement
  - The Story of Papworth, a 1935 British short drama film focused on a tuberculosis patient and his treatment at Papworth Village Settlement

== People with the surname ==
- Bert Papworth (1899 –1980), British trade unionist
- Betty Papworth (1914–2008), British communist and anti-war activist
- Brett Papworth (born 1963), Australian rugby league player
- Edgar George Papworth Senior (1809–1866), English sculptor
- Edgar George Papworth Junior (1832–1927), English sculptor
- George Papworth (1781–1855), English architect; brother of John Buonarotti Papworth
- Jack Papworth (1894–1942), English footballer
- John Papworth (1921–2020), English journalist
- John Buonarotti Papworth (1775–1847), English architect; brother of George Papworth and father of John Woody Papworth
- John Woody Papworth (1820–1870), English architect and heraldic antiquary; son of John Buonarotti Papworth; compiler of Papworth's Ordinary, often cited simply as "Papworth"
- Sir William Papworth (c.1331–1414), English Member of Parliament
- Wyatt Papworth (1822–1894), English architect, son of John Buonarotti Papworth
