= J. W. Molyneux-Child =

J. W. Molyneux-Child in France.

Lieutenant-Colonel John Walter Molyneux-Child, TD (1939 - 2 February 2015) was a British Army officer, mechanical engineer, and businessman in electronics. After he became the 33rd lord of the Manor of Papworth and the 27th lord of the Manor of Dedswell, both by inheritance, he began to research the history of the English manorial system, about which he became an expert and wrote a book.

== Early life and family ==
John Walter Molyneux-Child was born in 1939 and educated at St Hugh's School, a preparatory school near Faringdon, Oxfordshire, located in Carswell Manor and then continued his studies at Clifton College, in Bristol. He subsequently studied engineering at university, earning a B.Sc.(Eng). He married and had two sons Patrick and Rory. He later married his second wife Mij.

== Career ==
Molyneux-Child was an officer in the British Army's territorial force. He was appointed 2nd lieutenant in 1959, and eventually rose to the rank of lieutenant colonel in the Royal Electrical and Mechanical Engineers. He was awarded the Territorial Decoration.

He was the chairman of several electronics firms and wrote a book on RFI/EMI shielding materials that was published in 1992 and in a revised edition with a new title of EMC shielding materials in 1997. Late in life he bought Le Manoir de Tachau, near Duras, in the Dordogne, France, which he renovated and ran as a holiday business for the British. In 2011, he appeared in the television series Little England which profiled the experiences of British holiday-makers and expatriates in France in a lightly humorous way.

== Lord of the manor ==
In 1984, Molyneux-Child became the 33rd lord of the Manor of Papworth and the 27th lord of the Manor of Dedswell, both by inheritance from the trustees of the 6th Earl of Onslow (died 1971), and in succession to the 7th Earl of Onslow (died 2011) who relinquished the titles in that year. Acquiring the manors kindled Molyneux-Child's interest in their history and in the history of the manorial system generally and he began to research the subject and wrote a book of his findings, The evolution of the English manorial system, that was published in 1987. Molyneux-Child exercised his right as lord of the manor to appoint manorial officials such as ale tasters and hangmen which he combined with fund-raising for charity.

== Death ==
Molyneux-Child died at home in Ripley, Surrey, on 2 February 2015. He was survived by his wife and sons.

== Selected publications ==
- The evolution of the English manorial system. The Book Guild, Lewes, 1987. ISBN 0863322581
- RFI/EMI shielding materials: A designer's guide. Woodhead, 1992. ISBN 9781855730427
- EMC shielding materials. Newnes, Oxford, 1997. ISBN 9780750635486

== See also ==
- English feudal system
- Manorialism
