= Lugar, East Ayrshire =

Village in East Ayrshire, Scotland

Coordinates: 55°28′N 4°14′W

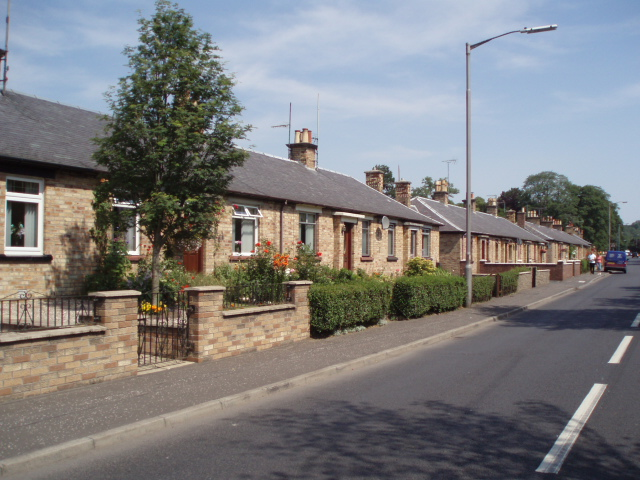
Houses in Lugar, 2006

Lugar is a small village in East Ayrshire, southwest Scotland. Lugar is in Auchinleck Parish, Kyle District, Ayrshire. It is 1.5 miles (2.4 km) ENE of Cumnock, and about 1-mile (1.6 km) from Cronberry and 2 miles (3.2 km) from Gaswater. Lugar was a station on the Mauchline and Muirkirk branch of the Glasgow and South Western Railway. Lugar is about 16.5 miles (26.6 km) SE of Kilmarnock.

Lugar was once dominated by a large ironworks with several blast furnaces. Like the mining industry in nearby areas, though, the iron industry has been destroyed by economic decline. The Lugar ironworks closed long ago.

Lugar was built to accommodate the workers at the ironworks around 1845. They were housed in "miners' raws" (sic). On the 1860 Ordnance Survey Map the rows included Peesweip Row, Craigstonholm Row, Store Row, Back Row and Hollowholm Row.(This map also shows a Curling Pond). Other maps included Laigh Row, Double Row and High Row. The population grew to 753 in 1861, and 1374 in 1871. By 1881 it had 1353 people and 1891 people, according to the Ordnance Survey.

The Lugar Institute was created in 1892 by a Mr. Weir of Kildonan. The Institute consisted of a lecture hall with a capacity of 400, a reading room, recreation room (for chess etc.), billiard room and bowling alley. It was partially demolished, and some of the remaining parts have been recently restored.

A local church, established in 1867, is another prominent feature of Lugar.

The Lugar Boswell Thistle Football Club is a Scottish football club based there. The club is nicknamed The Jaggy Bunnets. They were formed in 1878 as a senior team, turning to the juniors after a short spell.

The 65th Ayrshire scout troop in the Kylesmuir District is based in Lugar.

Near Lugar, at Bello Mill Cottage on the estate of James Boswell in Auchinleck, William Murdoch was born in 1754. Murdoch did some important experiments on steam engines and was the inventor of gas lighting. Murdoch's Cave where he carried out a lot of his experiments on coal gas can still be seen on the riverbank of the Lugar Water.

== Geology: the Lugar Sill ==
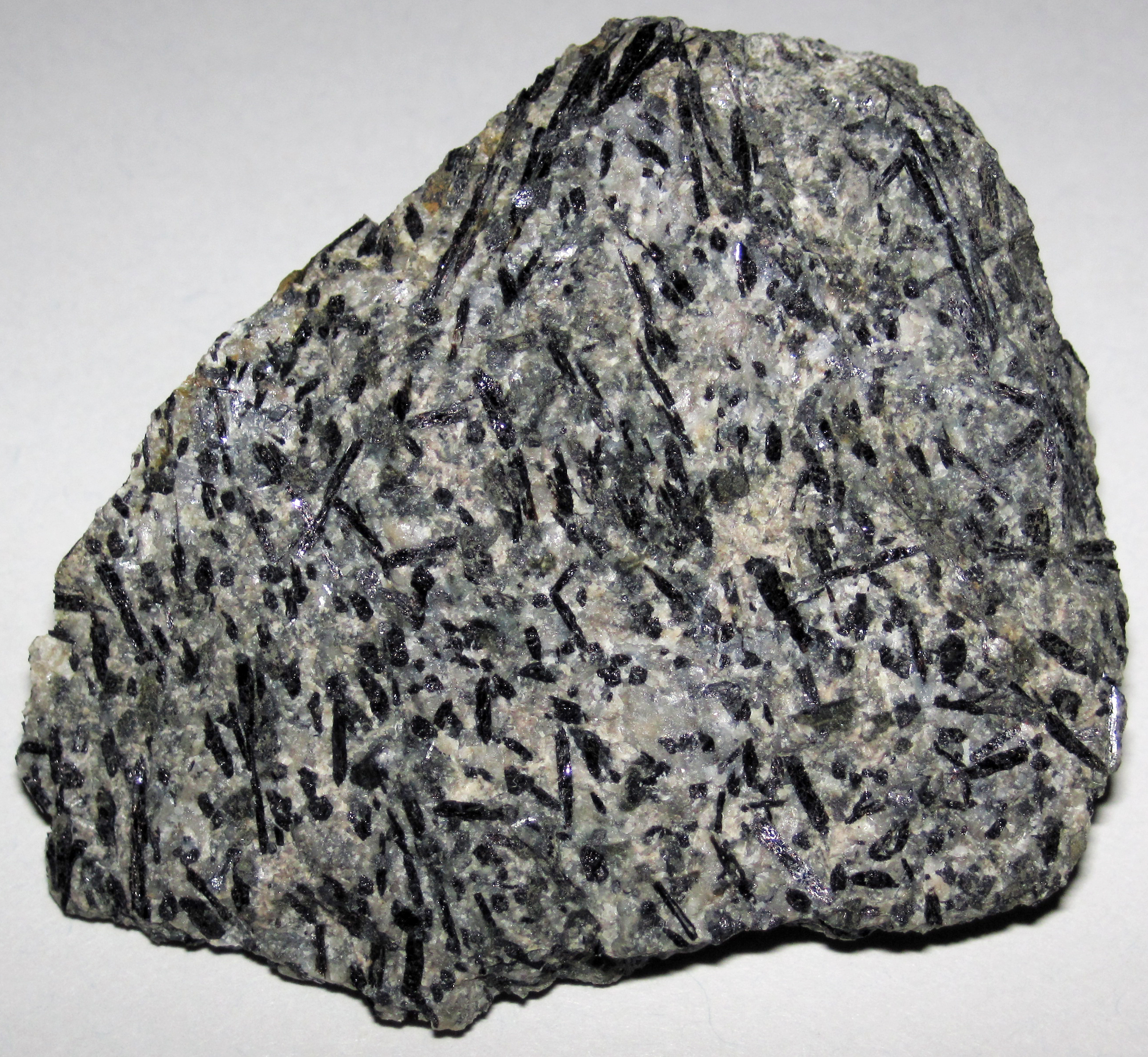
Lugarite from the Lugar Sill near Lugar, Ayrshire

Close to the village, and cropping out for a length of about 5 kilometres in a NE-SW direction, is the Lugar Sill, an internationally studied geological feature and a Site of Special Scientific Interest. It has been intruded in several phases (on or close to the Carboniferous-Permian boundary) in molten form (magma) into the local sandstone and then crystallised. The thickness of the igneous rock is estimated at 42-49 m. It extends in a general north-easterly direction from Lugar, 2.5 km beyond the village of Cronberry. Its composition overall is outer teschenite units and a thick core of layered theralite and picrite including lugarite, (a coarse-grained rock consisting of euhedral crystals of titanaugite and kaersutite up to 7cm long with corroded feldspars and ilmenite set in a cloudy greyish base of analcime, nepheline and alteration products). The sill represents a nearby magma source differentiating in situ to give sequentially injected layers of slightly different chemical composition.

== Ironworks ==
- 1845 - Lugar Ironworks opened
- 1848 - Muirkirk Branch of the Glasgow and South Western Railway, Auchinleck to Muirkirk opened. The line served the Lugar Ironworks, the Muirkirk Ironworks and various coalmines
- 1856 - Lugar Ironworks bought by the Eglinton Ironworks Ltd
- 1928 - Lugar Ironworks closed. Site later used by the National Coal Board as regional headquarters and workshops.
