= Murdoch's Cave =

Cave in East Ayrshire, Scotland

- Murdock's Cave
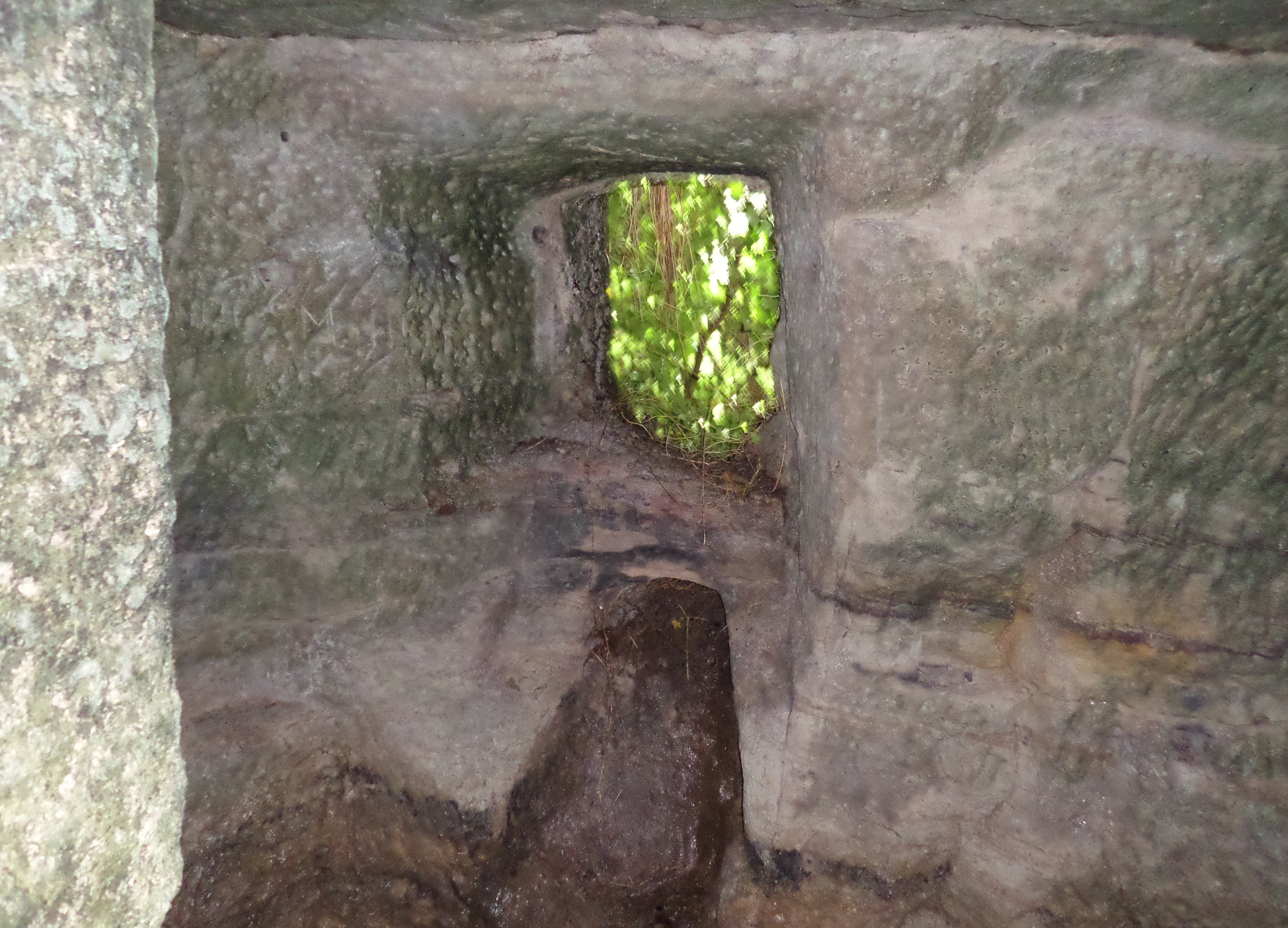
- The interior of Murdoch's Cave showing the fireplace
- Interactive map of Murdoch's Cave
- Location: Lugar, East Ayrshire
- OS grid: NS 59802 21549
- Coordinates: 55°28′03″N 4°13′09″W
- Elevation: 6 feet (1.8 m)
- Entrances: 1
- Difficulty: Easy
- Hazards: Access
- Access: Private

Murdoch's Cave, is a relatively small artificial cave created by William Murdoch (1754-1839) and his siblings in the soft red sandstone Lugar river bank cliff just upstream of the old Bellow Mill close to the confluence of the Bellow or Bello Water and the Glenmuir Water in Lugar, East Ayrshire, Scotland. The spelling 'Bellow' is used for consistency.

== The cave and access ==
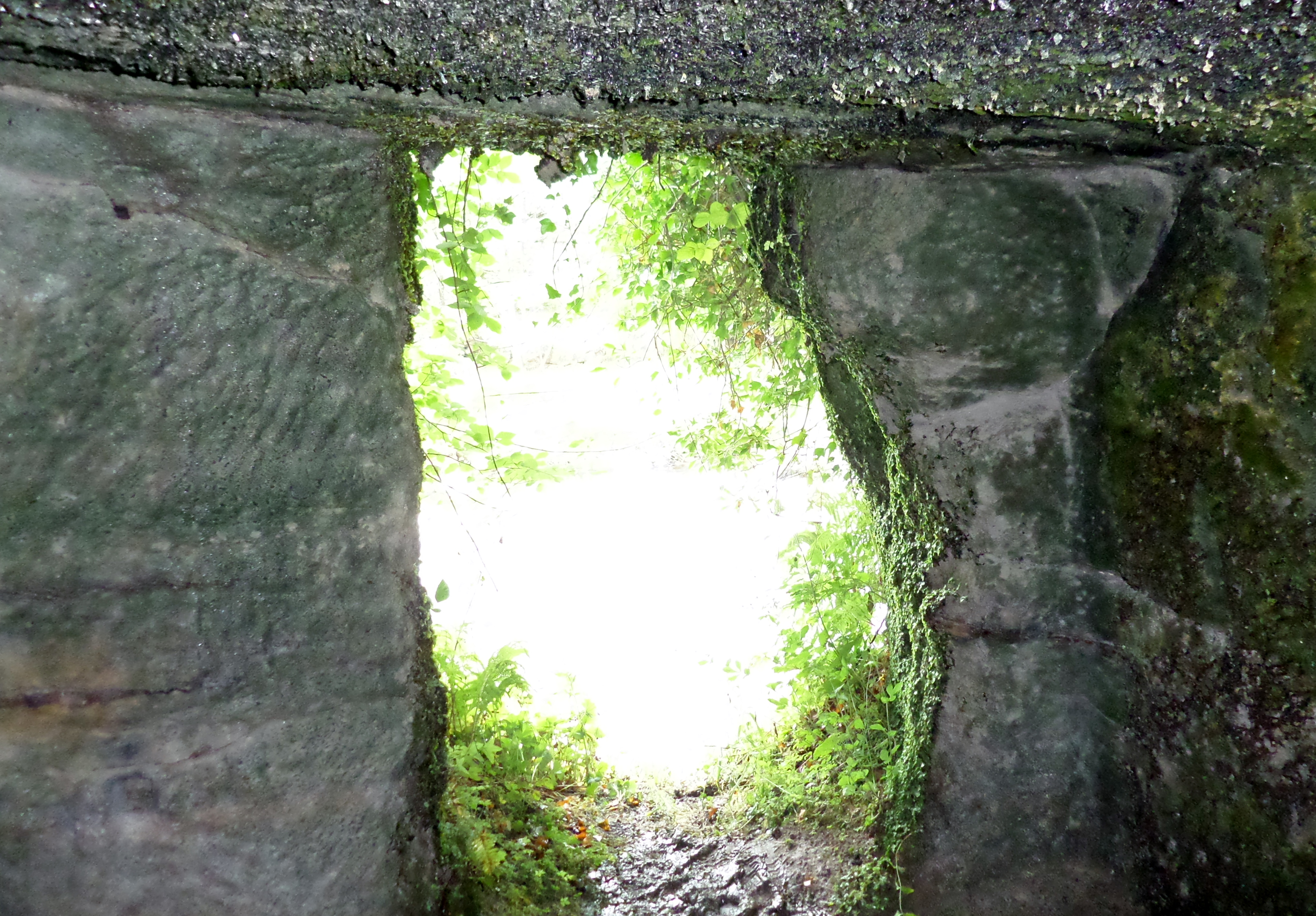
Entrance to the cave.

Murdoch's cave is located in a red sandstone cliff above the River Lugar on the north side of the water course, just below the old Bellow miller's house. It is not known whether or not the cave was altered after he left home in 1777 to find work in Birmingham and later in Cornwall.

The cave opening is obvious from the River Lugar and lies above the flood level of the river, with hand and foot holds that have been hammered into the rock face, however access is quite difficult during wet weather. Internally this small cave has several features such as a shelf for sitting, a small window, a well finished ceiling and a complex fireplace. A chimney flue constructed using a clay pipe ran from above the hearth up the vertical sandstone river bank cliff all the way to the miller's house where it connected with the kitchen chimney, giving a considerable draw.

As late as the mid 19th century a path led eastwards directly down from the Bellow miller's house to the cliff face above the cave so as to avoid the difficult access via the sluice and lade that carried water from the weir to the waterwheel.

The Bellow miller's house is a private residence and access to the old mill and the cave is only possible with permission from the owners.

== History ==
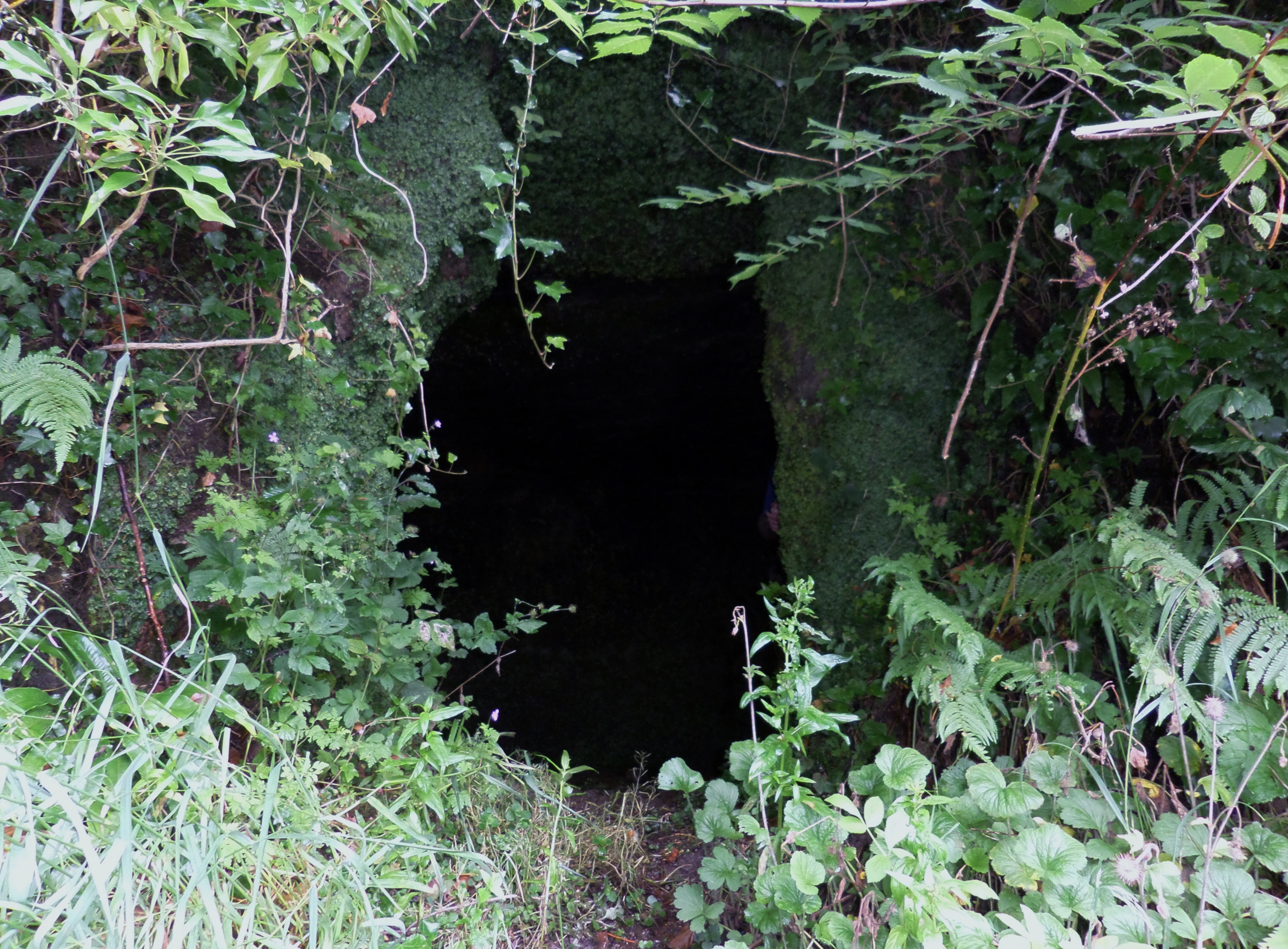
External view of the cave entrance.

William Murdoch, the acknowledged inventor of gas lighting, was born on 21 August 1754, the third of seven children. His father was John Murdoch, a millwright and tenant of Sir James Boswell at Bellow Mill in Auchinleck parish. William is said to have carried out early experiments into the use of steam and the manufacturing and use of natural gas. He is said to have placed a perforated thimble on the spout of the kettle and lit the gases escaping from the heated coal it contained as a source of light. He is at least said to have heated coal in a copper kettle in the Bello cave that lay around 70 feet or 21 metres from his father, John Murdoch's oatmeal mill.

No written record exists of the experiments that William Murdoch is traditionally said to have carried out however the considerable trouble he went to in regard of creating a draw up the chimney flue indicates more than casual use of a fire for heating and lighting the cave itself.

Cannel, splint or parrot coal was a familiar bituminous fuel in Ayrshire homes and it was named for its tendency to produce jets of bright burning gas with a tarry exudate. Earthenware containers of this coal were placed in the hearth to help illuminate the room in addition to the heat the coal produced.

== See also ==
- Cleeves Cove
- Peden's Cave (Auchinbay)
