= William Murdoch =

Scottish engineer and inventor (1754–1839)

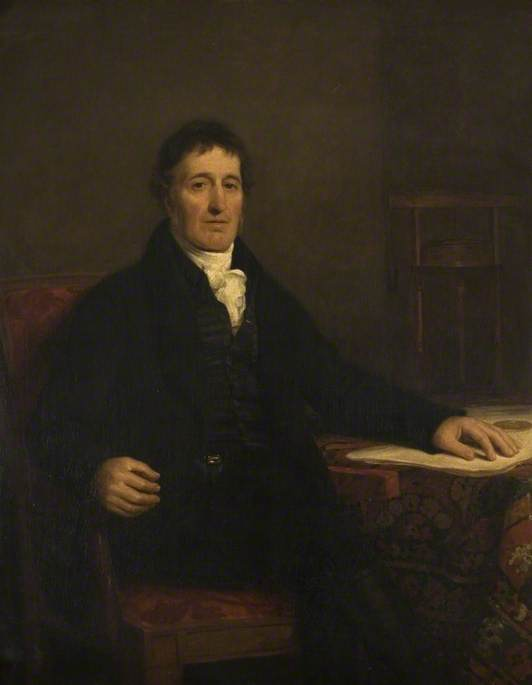
- Born: 21 August 1754; Lugar, Cumnock, Ayrshire, Scotland, United Kingdom
- Died: 15 November 1839 (aged 85); Handsworth, nr. Birmingham, England, United Kingdom
- Citizenship: Scottish
- Awards: Rumford Medal (1808)
- Scientific career
- Fields: Steam engines, Gas lighting

William Murdoch (sometimes spelled Murdock) (21 August 1754 – 15 November 1839) was a Scottish chemist, inventor, and mechanical engineer.

Murdoch was employed by the firm of Boulton & Watt and worked for them in Cornwall, as a steam engine erector for ten years, spending most of the rest of his life in Birmingham, England.

Murdoch was the inventor of the oscillating cylinder steam engine, and gas lighting is attributed to him in the early 1790s, as well as the term "gasometer". However the Dutch-Belgian Academic Jean-Pierre Minckelers had already published on coal gasification and gas lighting in 1784, and had used gas to light his auditorium at the University of Leuven from 1785. Archibald Cochrane, 9th Earl of Dundonald, had also used gas for lighting his family estate from 1789 onwards.

Murdoch also made innovations to the steam engine, including the sun and planet gear and D slide valve. He invented the steam gun and the pneumatic tube message system, and worked on one of the first British paddle steamers to cross the English Channel. Murdoch built a prototype steam locomotive in 1784, and made a number of discoveries in chemistry.

Murdoch remained an employee, and later a partner, of Boulton and Watt until the 1830s, but his reputation as an inventor has been obscured by the reputations of Matthew Boulton, James Watt, and the firm they founded.

== Early life ==
William Murdoch was born in Bello Mill Lugar, near Old Cumnock in Ayrshire, Scotland, the third of seven children and the first son to survive beyond infancy. A son of John Murdoch, a former Hanoverian artillery gunner and a Millwright and tenant of Bello Mill on the estate of James Boswell in Auchinleck, he was educated until the age of ten at the Old Cumnock Kirk School before attending Auchinleck school under William Halbert, author of a highly regarded arithmetic textbook. Murdoch excelled in mathematics. Murdoch also learned the principles of mechanics, practical experimentation and working in metal and wood by assisting in his father's work. Together with his father, he built a "wooden horse" about 1763. His "Wooden Horse on Wheels" was a tricycle propelled by hand cranks. There are reports that in his youth Murdoch was responsible for the construction of one of the bridges over the River Nith; this possibly derives from his father's work in building the Craikston Bridge over Lugar Water in 1774, which William would have been involved in. He is also said to have carried out experiments in coal gas, using coal heated in a copper kettle in a small cave near his father's mill.

== Birmingham ==
In 1777, at age 23, Murdoch walked to Birmingham, a distance of over 300 miles (480 km), to ask for a job with James Watt, the steam engine manufacturer. Both Watt and Murdoch were probably aware of each other because of their connections with James Boswell, who had made several visits to Watt's workshop at Soho. Watt's partner Matthew Boulton was so impressed by Murdoch's wooden hat, made on a lathe of his own design, that he hired him. Murdoch began his career with Boulton and Watt in the pattern workshop of their Soho Foundry, making patterns for the casting of machine parts. By 1778 Watt wrote:

if William Murdoch is not at home he should be sent for immediately as he understands the patterns and care must be taken to avoid mistakes of which our engine shop has been too guilty.

He Anglicised his name to "Murdock" when he settled in England. Murdoch progressed to work in fitting and erecting steam engines and was often sent from Soho for this purpose.

By 1779 Boulton was writing to Watt:

I think Wm. Murdock a valuable man and deserves every civility and encouragement.

On his first solo job erecting an engine at Wanlockhead Mine, Murdoch made the first of many improvements to the standard Boulton and Watt engine by rearranging the gears to enable the steam valve to be worked automatically by the action of the exhaust shaft.

== Cornwall ==
In September 1779 Murdoch was sent to Redruth in Cornwall as a senior engine erector, responsible for the erection, maintenance & repair of Boulton & Watt engines. These were used for pumping water out of the Cornish Tin mines, and therefore the efficiency and efficacy of the engines was an important factor in the amount of tin, and money, which could be extracted from a mine. At that time steam engines were not simply sold to customers but operated, and maintained by the builders for groups or individuals known as 'adventurers' (shareholders). The engine manufacturers were paid not for a completed engine but through a complex formula calculated on the basis of that engine's performance, as Watt described:

Our profits arise not from making the engine, but from a certain proportion of the savings in fuel which we make over any common engine, that raises the same quantity of water to the same height.

Therefore, Murdoch's skill in getting the most out of his engines directly impacted upon Boulton and Watts profits. This he did so successfully that by 1782 Boulton was writing:

We want more Murdocks, for of all others he is the most active man and best engine erector I ever saw...When I look at the work done it astonishes me & is entirely owing to the spirit and activity of Murdoch who hath not gone to bed 3 of the nights.

Due to the frequent problems which could occur with steam engines Murdoch was kept busy travelling around the area repairing and attempting to improve the performance of the engines under his care.

=== Industrial espionage ===
In Cornwall at that time there were a number of engine erectors competing with each other, each with different technical methods of achieving the same ends. As a result, a great deal of copying of mechanical innovations and violation of patents went on, often through the reporting of casual conversations between engineers and practical observations of engine modifications. The risk of his patents being infringed was something which particularly exercised Watt, and so Murdoch was, in addition to his other activities, called upon to make reports and swear out affidavits for legal actions against Boulton & Watt's competitors. In the close knit and clannish Cornwall of the time this was sometimes at his own risk. As one of his colleagues stated to Watt:

If he makes an Affidavit against Carpenter or Penandrea, there will be no safety for him in Redruth.

This early industrial espionage did not operate all in one direction and Murdoch was often required to undertake inspections of competitors' engines, either to determine whether patents had been infringed or to assess the effectiveness of those engines.

== Mechanical improvements and inventions ==
While based in Cornwall, Murdoch had to deal with a wide range of mechanical problems related to steam engines, and this led him to make practical improvements to the basic steam engine designs used by Boulton and Watt. From 1782 there is evidence that Murdoch was discussing and collaborating with Watt on a number of inventions and improvements. There is, however, a dearth of letters from Murdoch to Watt from 1780 until 1797 in the Watt archive, possibly, as argued by John Griffiths, due to an attempt by Watt's son, James Watt Junior, to uphold his father's reputation by removing any evidence of the origin of some of the inventions he patented. It is almost certain that Murdoch's contract of employment, in common with those for other employees of Boulton and Watt, specified that anything he invented would be the intellectual property of his employers, and frequently it was they who filed, and benefited from, patents on these inventions.

One of Murdoch's most significant inventions, for which evidence exists to attribute it to him, was the sun and planet gear which allowed steam power to be used to "produce a continued Rotative or Circular Motion round an Axis or Centre, and thereby to give Motion to the Wheels of Mills or other Machines". This gear converted the vertical motion of a beam, driven by a steam engine, into circular motion using a 'planet', a cogwheel fixed at the end of a rod connected to the beam of the engine. With the motion of the beam this revolved around, and turned, the 'sun' a second rotating cog fixed to and which turned the drive shaft. This system of achieving rotary motion, which enabled Boulton and Watt to evade the patent of the crank held by James Pickard, was patented in by James Watt in his own name in October 1781 (although Samuel Smiles, biographer of Boulton and Watt, attributes the invention to Murdoch; there also exists a drawing of the sun and planet system in Murdoch's hand dated August 1781). Other evidence attributing this invention to Murdoch takes the form of a letter from Boulton to a colleague concerning Watt's forthcoming October patents in which he writes:

He has another rotative scheme to add, which I could have told him of long ago when first invented by William Murdock but I do not think it a matter of much consequence.

Another innovation of Murdoch's was his 1799 invention of a much simplified and more efficient steam wheel than those in use at the time. A precursor of the steam turbine, the steam wheel allowed the wheel to be directly turned by the pressure of the steam moving through it. By this time Murdoch's contract had been amended and he was able to patent this device in his own name.

Murdoch also carried out a number of experiments with compressed air and developed the first pneumatic message system which worked by using compressed air to propel a message in a cylinder through a tube to its intended destination. This system was developed by the London Pneumatic Despatch Company and became widely used; Harrods in particular used this system until at least the 1960s. Murdoch also used compressed air to ring a bell at his home to announce visitors.

Some of Murdoch's other minor inventions and experiments were: a machine developed in 1784 or 1785 in Cornwall for drilling wooden pipes, (in 1810 this was further developed and patented for stone pipes), a steam cannon which he attempted to use in 1803 to knock down a wall at Soho, a steam gun in the same year which fired 3 cm lead bullets, and machinery to grind and compress peat moss under great pressure to produce a material with "the appearance of the finest Jet".

== Steam powered locomotion ==
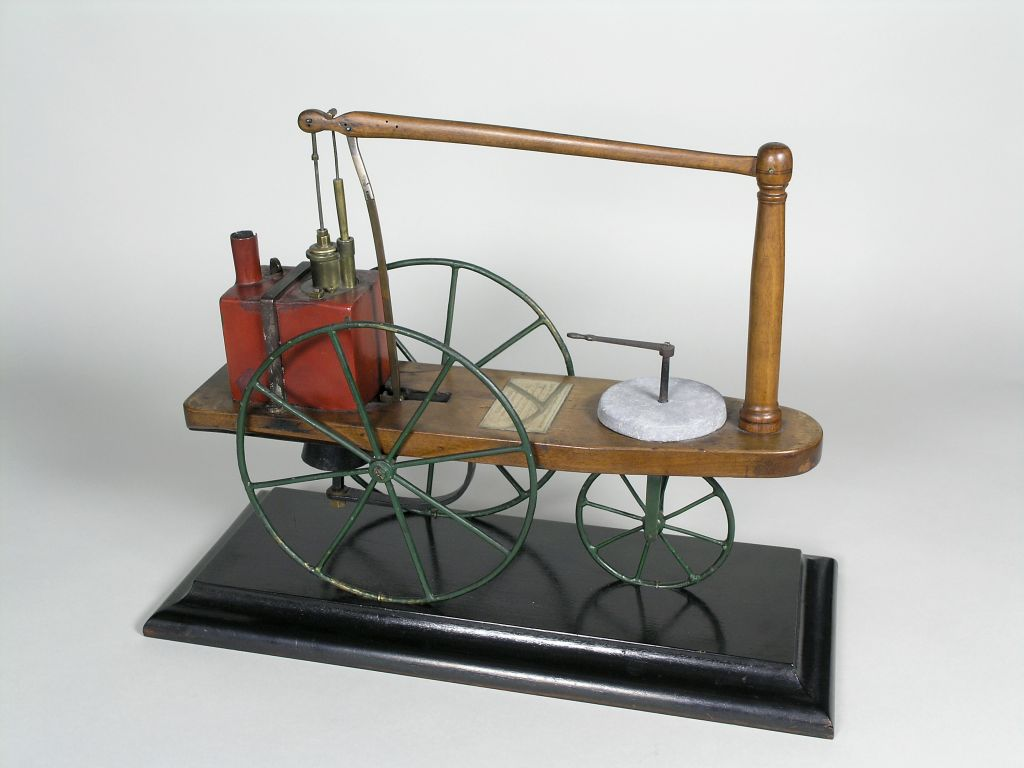
Murdoch's model steam carriage

An important invention for which Murdoch receives less credit than one might expect is Britain's first working model of a steam carriage, or road locomotive, in 1784. French engineer Nicolas-Joseph Cugnot had already demonstrated the utility of such a device by building (from 1769) two full-sized working steam vehicles, one of which was designed to carry 4–5 tonnes. All that was needed was a more effective design.

The earliest mention of Murdoch's thoughts and plans for this method of transport was in March 1784 when his colleague in Cornwall, Thomas Wilson, wrote to Watt on Murdoch's "new scheme":

It is no less than drawing carriages upon the road with steam engines...he says that what he proposes, is different from anything you ever thought of, and that he is positively certain of its answering and that there is a great deal of money to be made by it.

Replies from Watt made it clear that he thought there was no future in such an idea and, fearful of losing Murdoch's services in Cornwall, attempted to dissuade him from the scheme.

A later letter from Boulton disclosed more details of Murdoch's ideas:

He proposes to catch most of the condensed Steam by making it strike against broad Copper plates & the condensed part trickling down may be caught and returned into its Boiler or other reservoir. This may do some good in rain or frosty weather & he proposes to have different sized revolvers to apply at every hill & every vale according to their angle with ye Horizon... I verely believe he would sooner give up all his cornish business & interest than be deprived of carrying the thing into execution.

In the same letter Boulton also secretly urged Watt to include a scheme for a steam-powered carriage in his patent application, which Watt did shortly thereafter.

I have given such descriptions of engines for wheel carriages as I could do in the time and space I could allow myself; but it is very defective and can only serve to keep other people from similar patents.

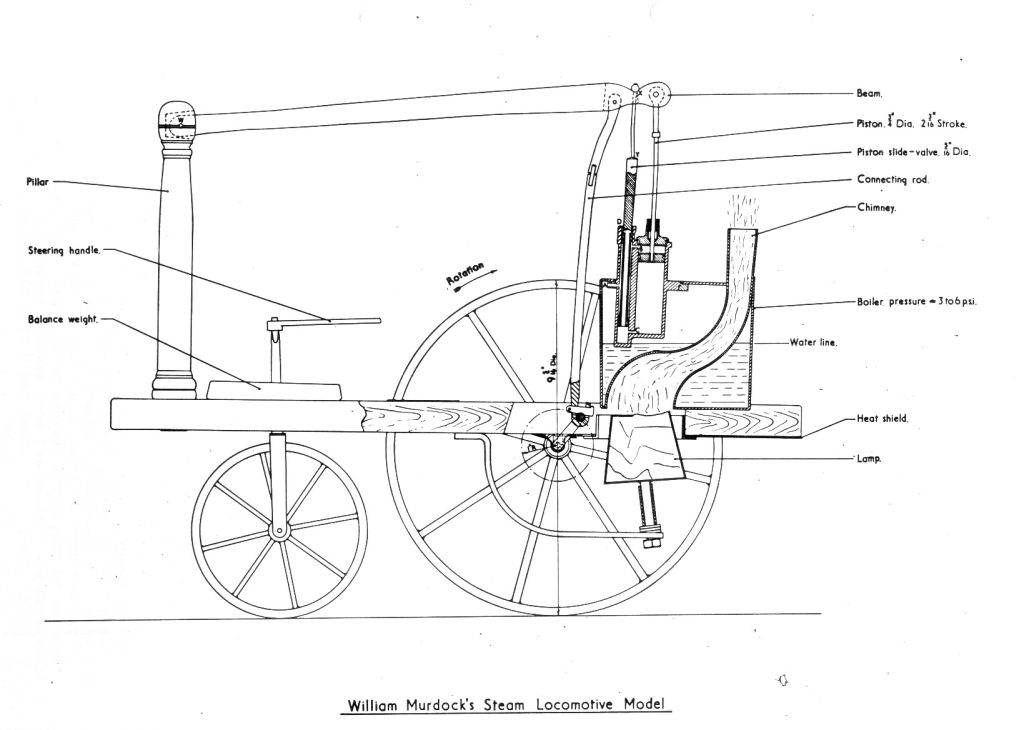
Murdoch's steam locomotive model

By this time Murdoch had already built a working model of his steam carriage (now in Thinktank, Birmingham Science Museum); accounts exist from witnesses who "saw the model steam carriage run around Murdoch's living room in Redruth in 1784". This is the first recorded example in Great Britain of a man-made machine moving around completely under its own power.

Murdoch's working model was a three-wheeled vehicle about a foot in height with the engine and boiler placed between the two larger back wheels with a spirit lamp underneath to heat the water and a tiller at the front turning the smaller front wheel. The mechanics of the model locomotive incorporated a number of innovations, such as a boiler safety valve, having the cylinder partly immersed in the boiler and using a new valve system on the lines of the D-slide valve.

This model was not the only one made by Murdoch as he continued experimenting with the design and by August 1786 had made at least one other model, of a different size, which we know of. Apart from this Murdoch does not appear to have worked much on his ideas from 1784 to 1786, because of the continuing high volume of work for Boulton and Watt, his marriage in 1785, and the birth of his and his wife's twins in the same year. Shortly after this birth, and with a second model already built, Murdoch took steps to patent his steam locomotive. However, at Exeter on the way to London he was met by Boulton who persuaded him to return to Cornwall without registering the patent. As Boulton wrote to Watt on 2 September 1795:

He said He was going to London to get Men but I soon found he was going there with his Steam Carg to shew it & to take out a patent. He having been told by Mr W. Wilkn what Sadler had said & he had likewise read in the news paper Simmingtons puff which had rekindled all Wms fire & impations to make Steam Carriages. However, I prevailed upon him readily to return to Cornwall by the next days diligence & he accordingly arivd here this day at noon, since which he hath unpacked his Carg & made Travil a Mile or two in Rivers's great room in a Circle making it carry the fire Shovel, poker & tongs.

This demonstration of his steam carriage in Rivers Great Room, at the King's Head hotel, Truro, was the first public demonstration in Britain given of steam locomotion in action.

Although after 1786 there is no further mention of Murdoch's work on Steam Carriages in Watt's or Boulton's correspondence, a volume of evidence exists that he continued to work on it without his employers' support, and some argue that a full size version was built.

One story often told, both in respect of a full size carriage and one of his models, is that one night Murdoch decided to test his carriage outside on the open road and it soon outpaced him, leaving him to chase after it. Whilst chasing it he encountered a local clergyman in a state of considerable distress who had mistaken his carriage, with its billowing smoke and fire burning under the boiler, for the devil. This story may be accurate; however, is more likely to relate to a model than to a full-size steam carriage.

Another story often told, this one almost certainly apocryphal, is of Murdoch travelling from "mine to mine in a steam chaise lit by gas". Given the state of the roads at that time this can be discounted. However, it is argued by John Griffiths that Murdoch may have built a full-size steam carriage some time in the 1790s, which could be the source of this story.

A fact important to the later development of the steam locomotive by others was that, in 1797 and 1798, Richard Trevithick came to live in Redruth next door to the house where William Murdoch lived (1782 to 1798). Trevithick would have seen and been influenced by Murdoch's experiments, and would certainly have been aware of his work in this area. There is also a story told by Murdoch's son John of a visit by Trevithick and Andrew Vivian to see a model engine in 1794:

The model of the wheel carriage engine was made in the summer of 1792 and was then shown to many of the inhabitants of Redruth – about two years after Trevithick and A. Vivian called at my father's house in Redruth... My father mentions that... on that day they asked him to show his model of the wheel carriage engine which worked with strong steam and no vacuum. This was immediately shown to them in a working state.

In any event without the support of Boulton and Watt, who appear to have opposed Murdoch's work due to the need to use high pressure steam which Watt distrusted, Murdoch was unable to develop or gain publicity for his invention and it was left to Trevithick and others to develop it commercially later.

== Chemistry discoveries ==
In addition to his mechanical work Murdoch also experimented in the field of chemistry and made a number of discoveries. One such was the discovery, first recorded in 1784, of iron cement made from sal ammoniac, or ammonium chloride and iron filings, apparently discovered when Murdoch observed that these two components had accidentally mixed in his tool bag and formed a solid mass. This iron cement was used to fix and harden the joints of steam engines, thus creating a hard durable seal.

Another discovery, and the first for which Murdoch took out a patent, was that of

The art or method of making from the same materials and by the same processes entirely new copperas, vitriol, and different sorts of dye or dying stuff, paints and colours, and also a composition for preserving the bottoms of all kinds of vessels and all wood required to be immersed in water, from worms, weeds, barnacles, and every other foulness which usually does or may adhere thereto.

This patent was filed in 1791 and although it was not developed at the time this can be seen as the first step in the development of aniline dyes and coatings.

=== British isinglass ===
In 1795 Murdoch developed a replacement for isinglass, a precipitate made from sturgeon used in the clarifying of beer to remove impurities, which had to be imported from Russia at great expense. Murdoch's replacement was made from dried Cod and was much cheaper than the 25 shillings a pound which isinglass cost. This cost saving was so attractive that the Committee of London Brewers paid £2000 for the right to use his invention.

Murdoch's isinglass replacement was so effective that in a court case brought by the British Customs and Excise Authorities, the noted chemist, Sir Humphry Davy in answer to a question on whether it was "proper to be used for the purpose of fineing beer" testified that:

I believe it is if properly prepared – it is the same substance as Isinglass.

Use of Murdoch's "Isinglass made of British fish" continued and played an important role in reducing British brewers' reliance on imported raw materials.

== Gas lighting ==
The key invention for which Murdoch is best known is the application of gas lighting as a replacement for oil and tallow produced light. It was in 1792 that he first began experimenting with the use of gas, derived from the heating of coal and other materials, for lighting. Many believe this experimenting took place in a cave. There is some uncertainty as to when he first demonstrated this process in practice; however, most sources identify this as between 1792 and 1794. About a decade before Murdoch, the Dutch-Belgian academic Jean-Pierre Minckelers was the first to use gas lighting on a practical scale.

To use gas for practical purposes it was first necessary to develop a working method for the production and capture of the gas. There is considerable doubt as to the date by which this process was perfected. However, numerous accounts exist that by 1794 Murdoch was producing coal gas from a small retort containing heated coals with a three or four-foot iron tube attached, through which he piped the gas before sending it through an old gun barrel and igniting it to produce light.

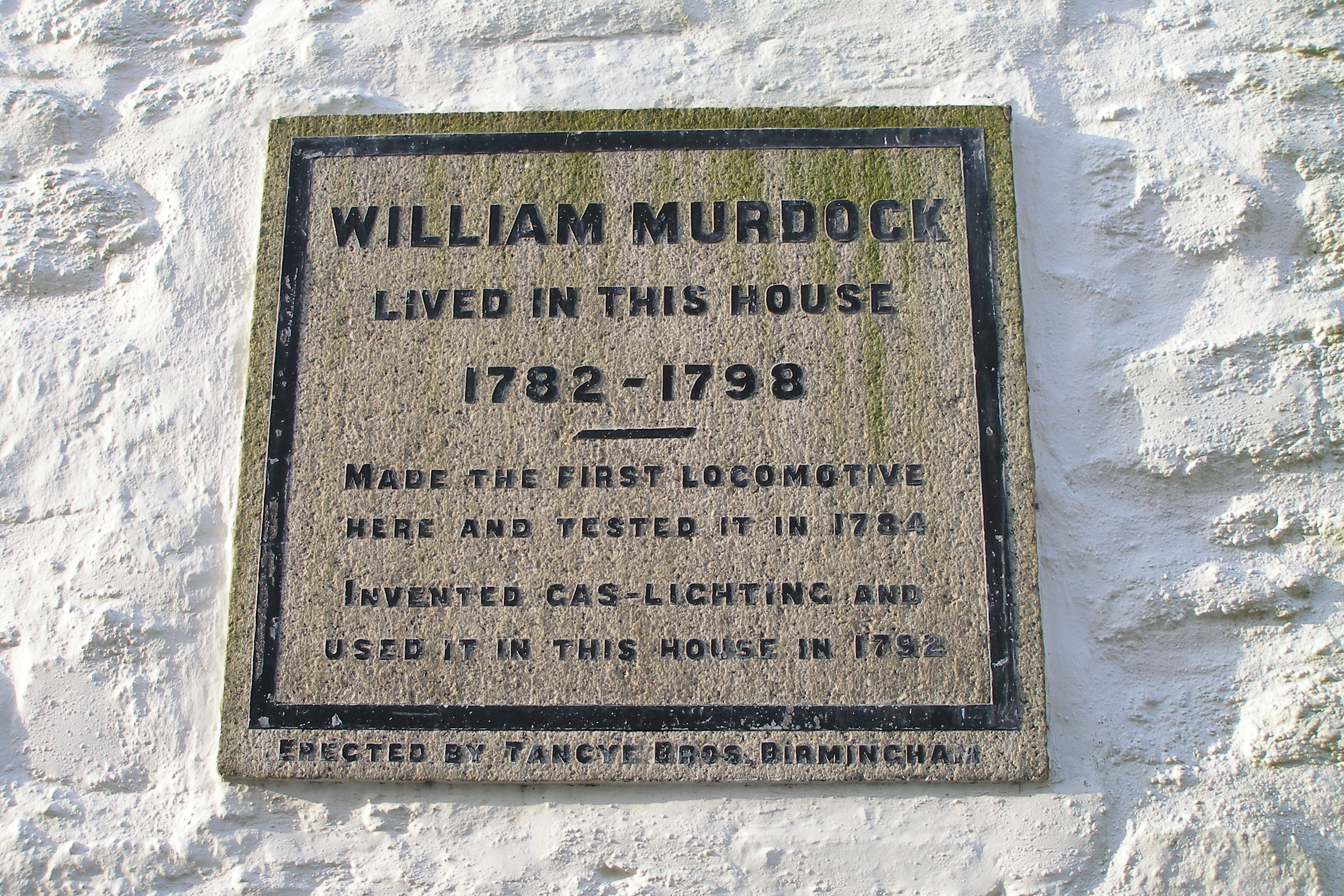
Close up of plaque on wall of Murdoch House

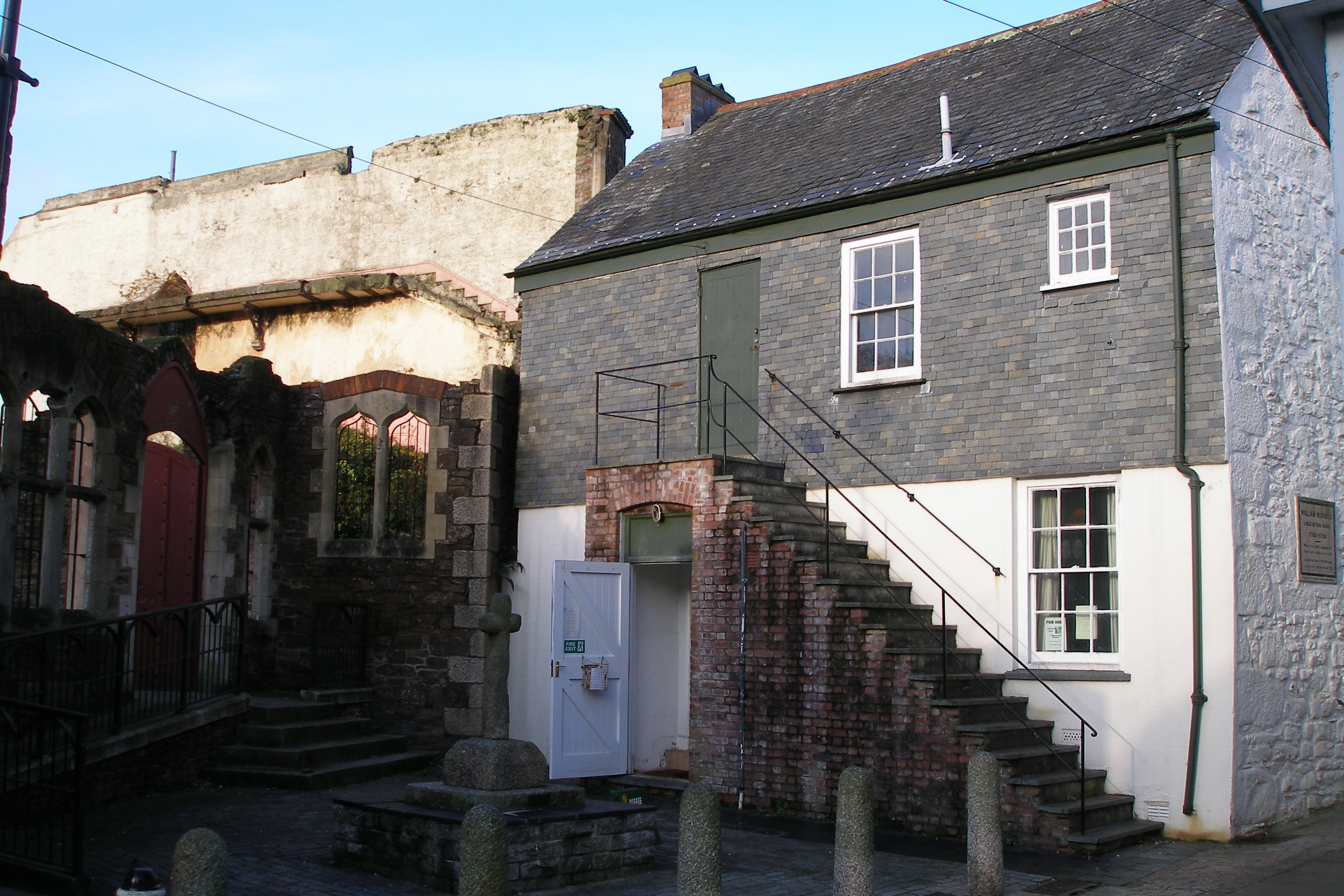
Murdoch House in Redruth

Murdoch's house at Redruth was the first domestic residence to be lit by gas.

Over the next few years Murdoch performed "a series of experiments upon the quantity and quality of the gasses contained in different substances" and upon the best way of transporting, storing, purifying and lighting these. It is known, by the account of William Fairbairn that Murdoch occasionally used his gas as a portable lantern:

"It was a dark winter's night and how to reach the house over such bad roads was a question not easily solved. Mr Murdoch, however, fruitful in resource, went to the gasworks where he filled a bladder which he had with him, and, placing it under his arm like a bagpipe, he discharged through the stem of an old tobacco pipe a stream of gas which enabled us to walk in safety to Medlock Bank."

In 1798 Murdoch returned to Birmingham to work in the Soho foundry and continued his experiments with gas, as part of which he lit the interior of the Soho main building, although it is likely that it was lit only in part and not (at this time) permanently. In 1802 as part of the public celebrations of the Peace of Amiens he made a public exhibition of his lighting by illuminating the exterior of the Soho Foundry. The first industrial factory to be illuminated by gas was the Philips and Lee cotton mill in Manchester which was fully lit by Murdoch in 1805, four years after the idea was first broached. Initially this mill contained 50 gas lights, although this soon grew to 904. The length of time taken to complete this project was partly due to experimentations and improvements in the process developed by Murdoch to make the lighting of a large factory by gas practicable and cost effective – such as purifying the gas with lime to remove the smell and determining the best temperature to heat coal to obtain the maximum quantity of gas – although Murdoch continued to be involved in other engine work for Boulton and Watt, which took up much of his time.

Despite his pioneering work with gas Murdoch never made any money from this invention due to his failure to obtain a patent. This may have been partly a result of the advice of James Watt, Junior, that the discovery was not patentable, and partly a result of the commercial failure of his earlier patent of 1791 for an early form of aniline dye. This failure to apply for a patent, despite the commercial participation of Boulton and Watt in this field, left the fledgling industry of gas production and lighting open for exploitation by other commercial interests, such as his former assistant Samuel Clegg and Frederick Albert Winsor. In large part this was due to the failure of Boulton and Watt to make sufficient effort to expand from the factory and mill lighting market which they dominated by 1809 into the street and domestic lighting market. This reason for this lassitude is unknown but can be attributed to lack of interest, a failure to appreciate the size of the potential market, and a lack of desire to be involved in smaller, less prestigious projects. By May 1809 Boulton and Watt faced little competition in any gas market due to their success in lobbying Parliament to block the granting of a charter for the National Heat and Light Company, their only real competitor in this field. However, despite blocking the charter until 1812 this advantage was squandered as Boulton and Watt did not develop the gas market, or technology, and in 1814 abandoned the gas business. A few decades later most towns in Britain were lit by gas and most had their own gasworks.

Apart from the benefits of gas lighting and heating, the process for producing coal gas yielded a number of other substances which were subsequently successfully exploited. Among these were coke; ammonia; phenol (carbolic acid), a disinfectant and one of the components of bakelite, the first synthetic plastic invented in 1910; and coal tar, which contained a number of organic chemicals. Coal tar was subsequently used to produce the first synthetic dye, mauve, by William Henry Perkin in 1856 and in 1853 was found, by Charles Gerhardt to contain the chemical acetylsalicylic acid, now known as aspirin.

== The Caledonia paddle steamer ==
Boulton and Watt had been involved in a minor way with attempts to apply steam power to boats, providing in 1807 for Robert Fulton the engine for North River Steamboat, the first steamboat to run on the Hudson River, (the boat later referred to as the Clermont). Murdoch was primarily responsible for designing and building this engine and for agreeing technical details and designs with Fulton, who also worked on the design of the engine. Boulton and Watt also provided engines for a number of other marine vessels. However, it was not until the purchase of The Caledonia by James Watt Jr. in 1817 that they became seriously involved in the marine engineering business. The task of refitting The Caledonia, building and installing new engines and boilers and making her seaworthy and efficient in fuel consumption was a difficult process and Murdoch, although frequently suffering from fever and rheumatism, directed this. By August the vessel was able to be tested on its intended route, from Surrey Commercial Docks, London to Gravesend and at first made 8 miles per hour (mph). During its sea trials Murdoch carried out experiments on The Caledonia to measure the effect on fuel consumption and speed of changes in the depth of the paddles and whether one or both engines were used. This resulted in an increase of speed to 12 mph (19 km/h).

While carrying out trials The Caledonia was challenged to a race by their competitors for the London to Gravesend route, the Sons of Commerce. Actually there were two races to Gravesend, both of which were won by the Boulton and Watt vessel, by a greater margin on the second attempt. The result was that the proprietors of the Sons of Commerce placed an order with Boulton and Watt for a new steamboat engine. There were also a number of other orders for steamboat engines, both for commercial customers and the Royal Navy, and Murdoch was in effect the head of this branch of the business, being referred to and deferred to on all aspects of their marine business. It is estimated that from 1813 until 1825, marine engines of over 3,000 horsepower (2,200 kW) were made by Boulton and Watt, and used in some 40 to 60 vessels.

Shortly after the trials were completed The Caledonia carried out a crossing of the English Channel when Watt Jr. took it to Rotterdam and up the Rhine to Koblenz.

== Later years ==
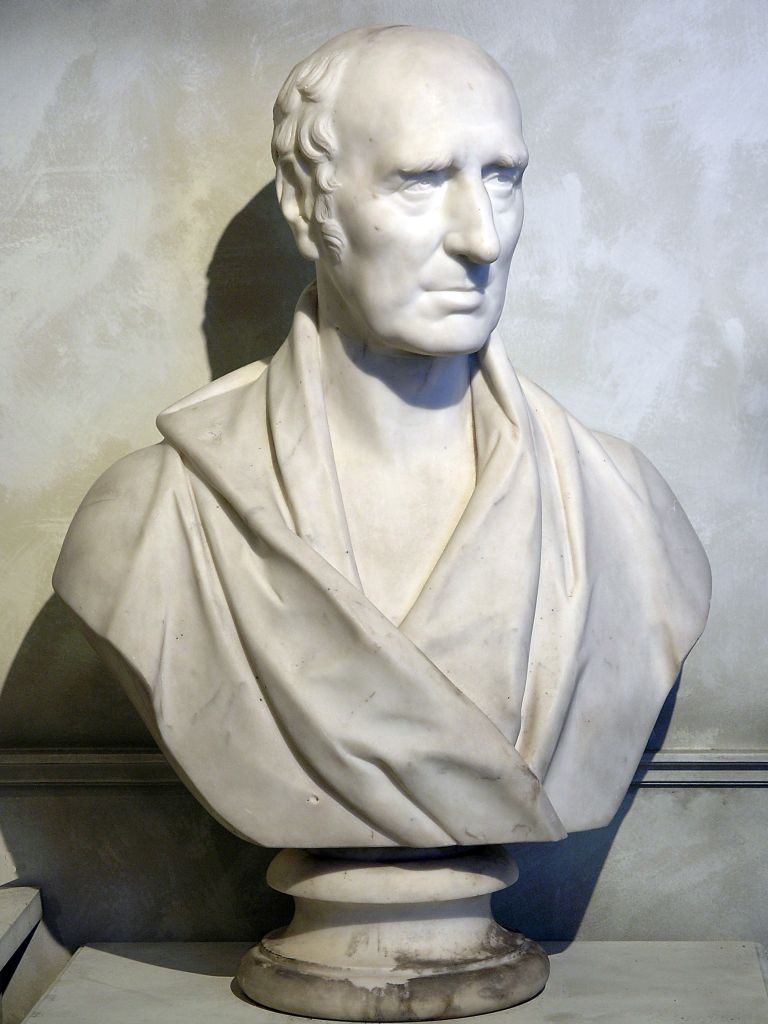
Marble Bust of Murdoch by E. G. Papworth

Murdoch wrote a paper, "Account of the Application of Gas from Coal to Economical Purposes" which was presented to the Royal Society in 1808. In that year he was awarded their Rumford Gold Medal for "both the first idea of applying, and the first actual application of gas to economical purposes".

In 1817 Murdoch moved into a large new house he had built outside Birmingham. The house incorporated a number of curiosities and innovations he has designed including gas lighting, a doorbell worked by compressed air and an air conditioning system: described by Joshua Field as "He has a good stove for heating the rooms with hot air which enters the rooms and staircases at convenient places." In 1815 he designed and installed the first gravity-fed, piped hot water system since classical times at the Royal Pump Rooms, Leamington Spa.

In September 1830, in declining health at age 76, Murdoch's partnership with Boulton & Watt which began in 1810 came to an end, at which point he was receiving £1,000 per year. The reasons for this appear to be both the increasing unprofitability of Boulton and Watt and Murdoch's increasing ill health. Murdoch died in 1839, aged 85. He was buried at St Mary's Church, Handsworth. His memorial, on the south wall of the chancel, records the anglicized spelling of his surname as Murdock and features a marble bust by Francis Leggatt Chantrey set beneath a pointed arch.

== Honours and awards ==
At the celebration of the centenary of gas lighting in 1892, a bust of Murdoch was unveiled by Lord Kelvin in the Wallace Monument, Stirling, and there is also a bust of him by Sir Francis Legatt Chantrey at St. Mary's Church.

His life and works are commemorated by the Moonstones; a statue of him, Boulton and Watt, by William Bloye; and Murdock Road, all in Birmingham. There is also a Murdoch House in Rotherhithe, London.

The town of Redruth has an Annual Murdoch Day in June. The 2007 event included a parade of schoolchildren with banners on the theme "Earth, Wind, Fire and Water" and the first public journey of a full-size, working reproduction of Murdoch's Steam Carriage.

In 2019, he was inducted into the Scottish Engineering Hall of Fame.
