= Theralite =

Igneous rock

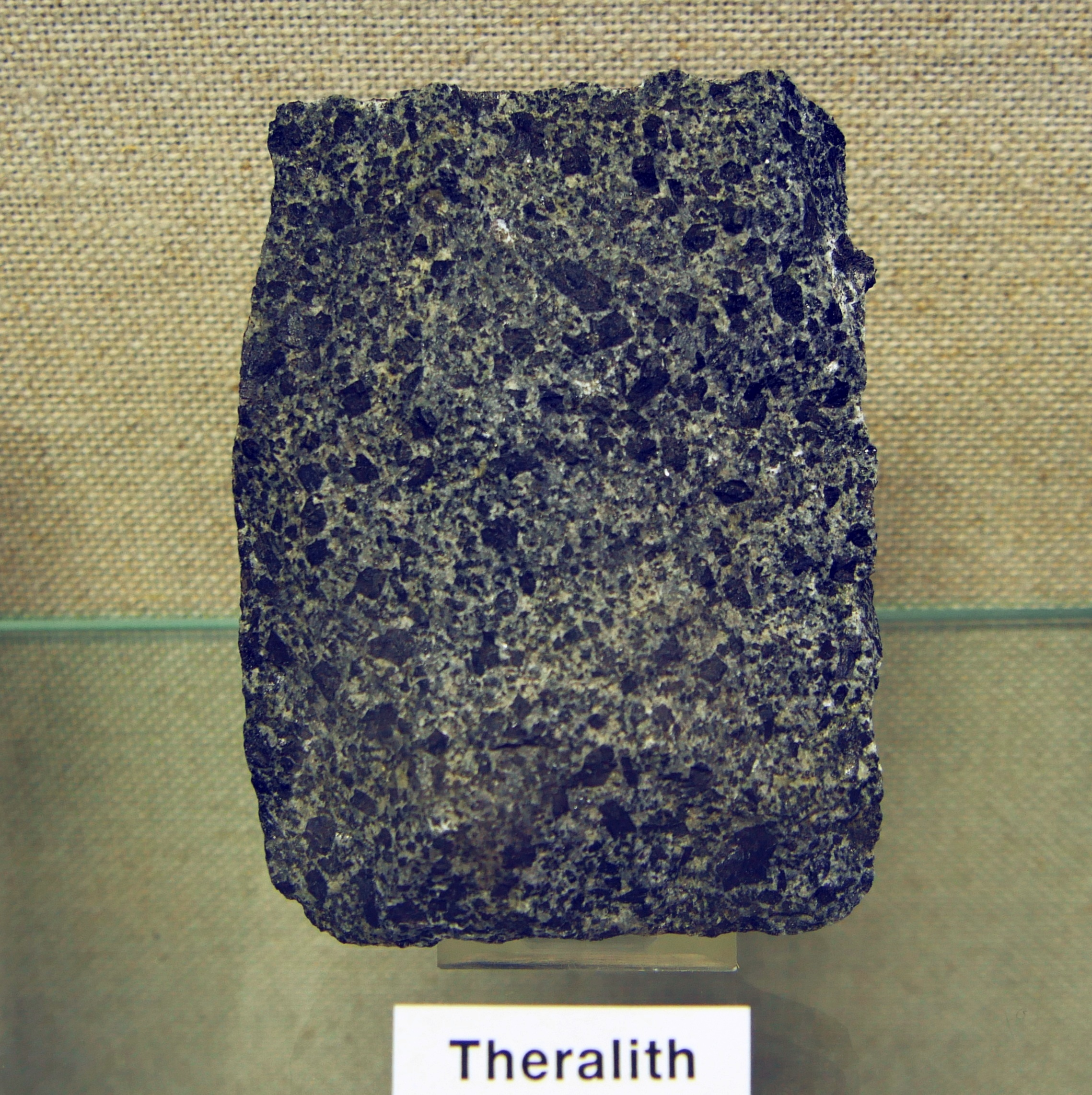
Theralite from Žilina, Nový Jičín, Czech Republic

Theralite (from Greek "to pursue") is, in petrology, the name given to calcic foidal gabbro, a holocrystalline plutonic rock consisting of augite, olivine, calcic plagioclase (labradorite), and nepheline, along with accessories including biotite, magnetite, ilmenite and analcime.

Theralite is the intrusive equivalent of nepheline basanite (a foidal basaltic rock with essential calcic plagioclase and essential olivine).

With the increase in silica (SiO_{2}) and the concomitant reduction in nepheline, theralite becomes gabbro. With a decrease in silica and reduction in olivine theralite grades into teschenite and with the addition of sodic feldspar, grades into essexite. With a further reduction in silica such that there is no feldspar these rocks become melteigites. With the addition of alkali feldspar replacing or becoming more dominant than calcic plagioclase theralites grade into foidal syenite, including shonkinite. Pyroxene in these rocks may be of green colour or purplish-brown and rich in titanium.

Properly theralite is only for a specific type of calcic foidal gabbro, those with essential nepheline and without essential analcime or sodic feldspar.

== Occurrence ==
Theralite occurs, for example, at Lugar Sill, Scotland,, in the Kamarbon alkaline gabbroic intrusion in Iran, and at the Crazy Mountains, Montana.

== Teschenites ==
Teschenites were once considered part of the theralite group. They contain essential pyroxene, olivine and analcime rather than nepheline. Modern petrology would classify the teschenites as an analcime-bearing gabbro. They are petrogenetically unrelated to nepheline gabbros as analcime is not produced by the same genetic processes.

== Essexites ==
Essexite is a form of silica-undersaturated pyroxene gabbro, containing nepheline and orthoclase as essential constituents, though often in small proportions. Essexites can be considered to represent the intrusive equivalent of an alkaline basalt.

Essexites are usually associated with other alkaline, silica undersaturated to monzonitic intrusive rocks and coeval high-alumina basalts.

Essexites are no longer considered part of the theralite group and are more properly known as nepheline monzogabbro or nepheline monzodiorite. The presence of orthoclase indicates a petrogenetic difference with nepheline gabbros.

== Bibliography ==
- This contains more detailed analytic and location data.
- theralite (mineral)- Britannica Online Encyclopedia|
- Heinrich, Microscopic Petrography, McGraw-Hill, 1956
