= Papper =

Papper is a surname. Notable people with the surname include:

- Emanuel Papper (1915–2002), American anesthesiologist, professor, and author
- Hélène Papper, French official of the United Nations

== See also ==
- Pepper
- Peppard
- Pappert
- Papworth
