= Southby =

Southby is a surname. Notable people with the surname include:

- Geoff Southby (born 1950), Australian rules footballer
- John Southby (disambiguation), several people
- Rhianna Southby (born 2000), English cricketer
- Richard Southby (1623–1704), English politician
- Southby Baronets
