= Pappert =

Pappert is a surname. Notable people with the surname include:

- Jerry Pappert (born 1963), American judge
- Johannes Pappert (fl. 1970–1976), Kraan band member
- Michael Pappert (born 1957), German basketball player

== See also ==
- Mary Pappert School of Music, Duquesne University, Pittsburgh, Pennsylvania
- Papper
