= Manor of Dedswell =

The Manor of Dedswell is located in the parish of Send with Ripley, Surrey, England. It has also been known historically as the Manor of Dodswell, Dadswell, and Dadswell Court. Its history is intricately connected with that of the manors of Send, Papworth, and West Clandon.

== Origins ==
The history of the Manor of Dedswell is intricately connected with that of the manors of Send, Papworth and West Clandon and the families that owned them. Like Papworth, Dedswell may be derived from the holding of Walter or Herbert recorded in the Domesday Book in 1086, but the matter is uncertain. Dedswell has had various names over the centuries, including the Manor of Dodswell, Dadswell, and Dadswell Court.

== History of the manor ==
The first lord of the manor was John de Deudeswell (also known as John de Wendeswell) in 1327 The manor then passed through the Weston family up to the mid seventeenth century before being owned by the Onslow family until 1984.

The 27th lord of the manor was Lieutenant Colonel John Walter Molyneux-Child who acquired it by inheritance in 1984 with the neighbouring Manor of Papworth from the trustees of the 6th Earl of Onslow (died 1971), and in succession to the 7th Earl of Onslow (died 2011) who relinquished the titles in that year. Acquiring the manors kindled Molyneux-Child's interest in their history and in the history of the manorial system generally and he began to research the subject and wrote a book of his findings, The evolution of the English manorial system, that was published in 1987. Molyneux-Child exercised his right as lord of the manor to appoint manorial officials such as ale tasters and hangmen which he combined with fund-raising for charity. Following Molyneux-Child's death in 2015, the manor passed to his eldest son Patrick Molyneux-Child.

== Manor house ==
The Dedswell manor house was built in the mid-fifteenth century with later additions and is a grade II listed building with Historic England. It borders the Clandon Stream and was subdivided after a large Victorian farmhouse was built nearby. No lord of the manor has occupied the house since the mid-fourteenth century.
