= John Southby =

John Southby may refer to:

- John Southby (1594–1683), Member of Parliament for Berkshire during the Commonwealth
- John Southby (c. 1652 – 1741), grandson of the preceding, Member of Parliament for Abingdon
