= Bill Jones (trade unionist) =

British trade unionist (1900–1988)

Joseph William Jones (10 March 1900 – 18 March 1988), known as Bill Jones, was a British trade union leader and communist activist.

Born in Bethnal Green, Jones enlisted in the British Army early in World War I, while still underage. His mother obtained his release, but he reenlisted in 1917, and continued to serve in the army until 1920. After a succession of short-term jobs, in 1925 he became a bus conductor for the London General Omnibus Company, and joined the Transport and General Workers' Union (TGWU or T&G).

During the UK general strike of 1926, Jones distributed the British Worker (the Trades Union Congress bulletin) and drove busses into obscure streets so that strikebreakers would have difficulty locating them. By the 1930s, he joined the Communist Party of Great Britain (CPGB). He was a vocal critic of TGWU General Secretary Ernest Bevin for not supporting the Republicans in the Spanish Civil War. Jones rose to a TGWU leadership position. He was also involved with the monthly magazine, The Busman's Punch, and its associated London Busman's Rank and File movement.

In May 1937, 25,000 London busworkers went on strike, calling for reduced working hours. Bevin quickly ended the strike, against the strikers' wishes, and expelled Jones and other prominent figures, including Bert Papworth, who had been connected to the Rank and File movement. While some of his expelled colleagues joined the rival National Passenger Workers' Union, Jones denounced it. Strong rank-and-file support for him and Papworth, along with their written assurances that they would abide by union rules, led to their readmittance to the TGWU in April 1938. Within a year, Jones was elected to the union's General Executive Council (GEC).

Jones served in the union during World War II, opposing strike actions while the war was in progress. In 1949, the TGWU banned any communist from holding an official post in the union; as a result, Jones was forced out of the GEC. He went back to his job as a bus conductor. Following Khrushchev's denunciation of Stalin in 1956, Jones dropped out of the Communist Party. This enabled him to rejoin the GEC. He eventually became chairman of the TGWU.

In 1965, after losing a bet on whether the "Beer Barrel Polka" was an English or Czech song, Jones and other London transport workers drove a number 11 bus to Prague and visited the composer Jaromír Vejvoda. Their bus journey was filmed by Czechoslovak television, and featured in a 33-minute film called "Londýnský autobus" ("The London bus").

From 1967 to 1969, Jones served on the General Council of the Trades Union Congress. After his retirement, he chaired the British Peace Committee, and was active in the pensioners' movement.

Bill Jones died on 18 March 1988, shortly after his 88th birthday.
