= Bello Mill =

Coordinates: 55°28′04″N 4°13′14″W

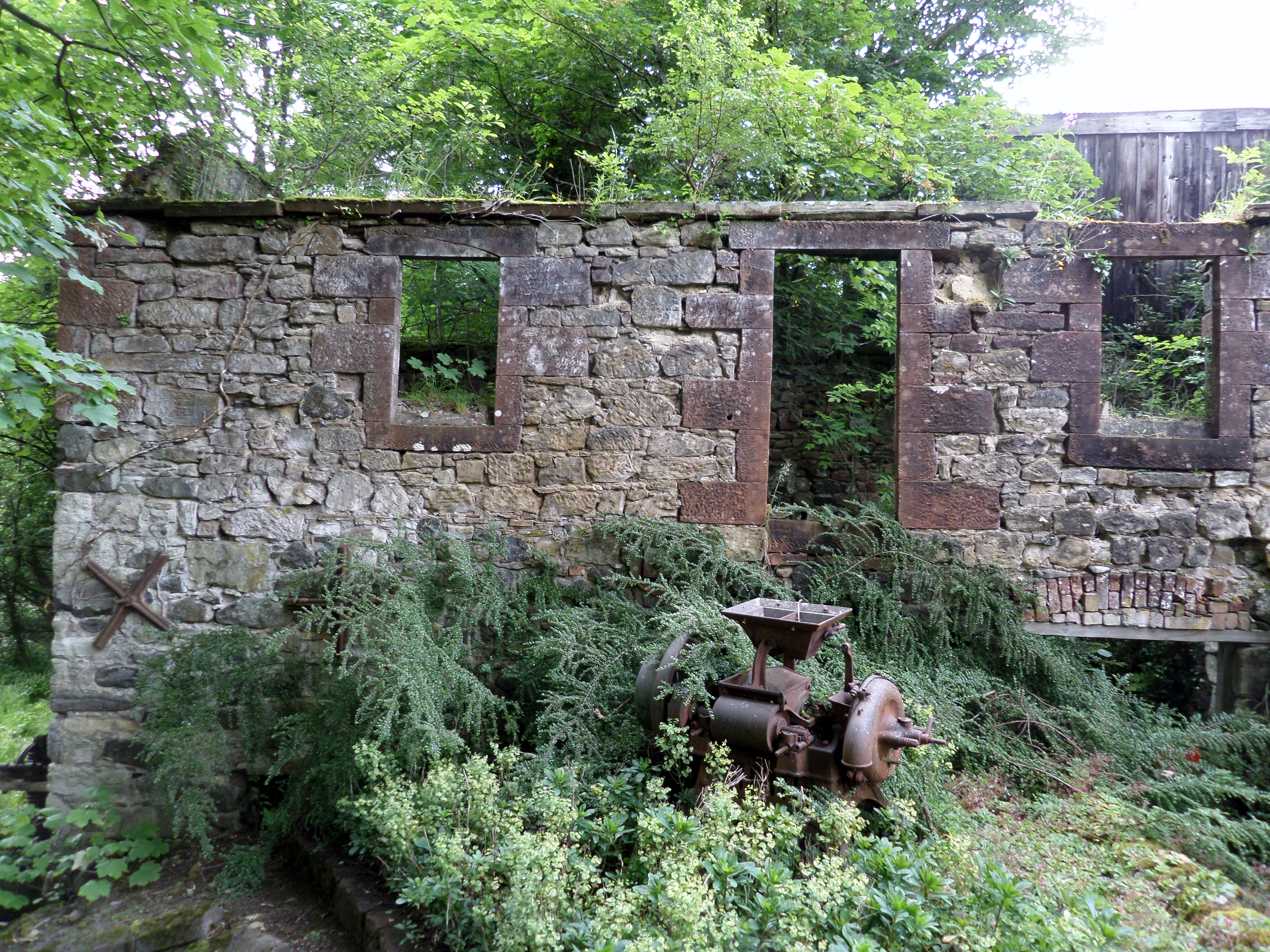
Bello Mill

Bello Mill (also spelt Bellow Mill) was a mill dating from the 18th century on the river called the Lugar Water, on the estate of James Boswell, Lord Auchinleck in Ayrshire, in Scotland. Before being rebuilt in the 1940s, it had three different sets of mill stones. It had one pair of millstones for rough grinding, and the two pairs of millstones for grinding oatmeal,

The neighboring Bello Mill Cottage is famous for being the birthplace of William Murdoch, who was born in 1754. Murdoch invented gas lighting and did experiments on steam engines in the nearby Murdoch's Cave. Murdoch's father John Murdoch was tenant and millwright at Bello Mill, which he had taken over in 1754.

In 1760, John Murdoch installed the first iron-toothed gears used in a mill in Britain at Bello Mill. These gears were cast at Carron's Foundry in Falkirk. Bello Mill was at that point the most technically sophisticated mill in the UK.

Bello Mill no longer is intact, but the gears are still visible. It was used until the 1960s. The roof is now missing and it is in danger of falling into the river.

The Bello Mill Cottage is still inhabited.
