= Edgar George Papworth Senior =

English sculptor (1809-1866)

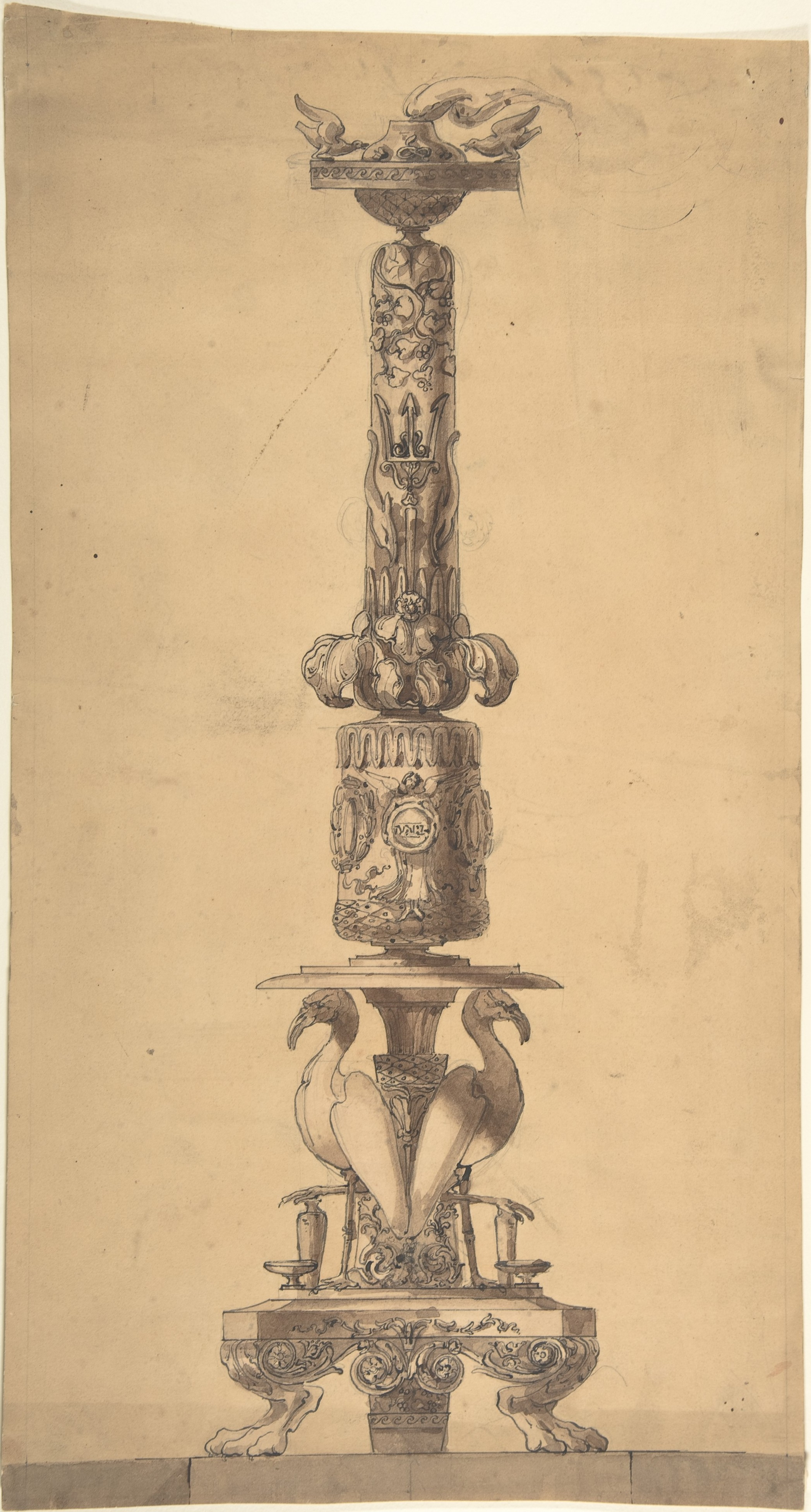
Design for a candelabrum, c. 1826–37, by Edgar George Papworth Snr

Edgar George Papworth Snr (20/21 August 1809 – 20 September 1866) was an English sculptor. He studied at the Royal Academy of Arts where he later exhibited works; he created sculptures of classical themes, and of notable people of the day.

== Family background ==
Edgar Papworth was born on 20 or 21 August 1809, the only son of Thomas Papworth (1773–1814), "builder, plasterer, and architect", who conducted the last stucco and plastering works carried on in London on a large scale. These works were founded by Thomas's father, John Papworth (1750–1799), and were situated in Great Portland Street and Newman Street. John Papworth was "master-plaisterer" at St James's Palace and Kensington Palace from 1780, and executed much stucco and plastering at the palaces, at Somerset House, and at Greenwich Hospital Chapel.

== Career ==
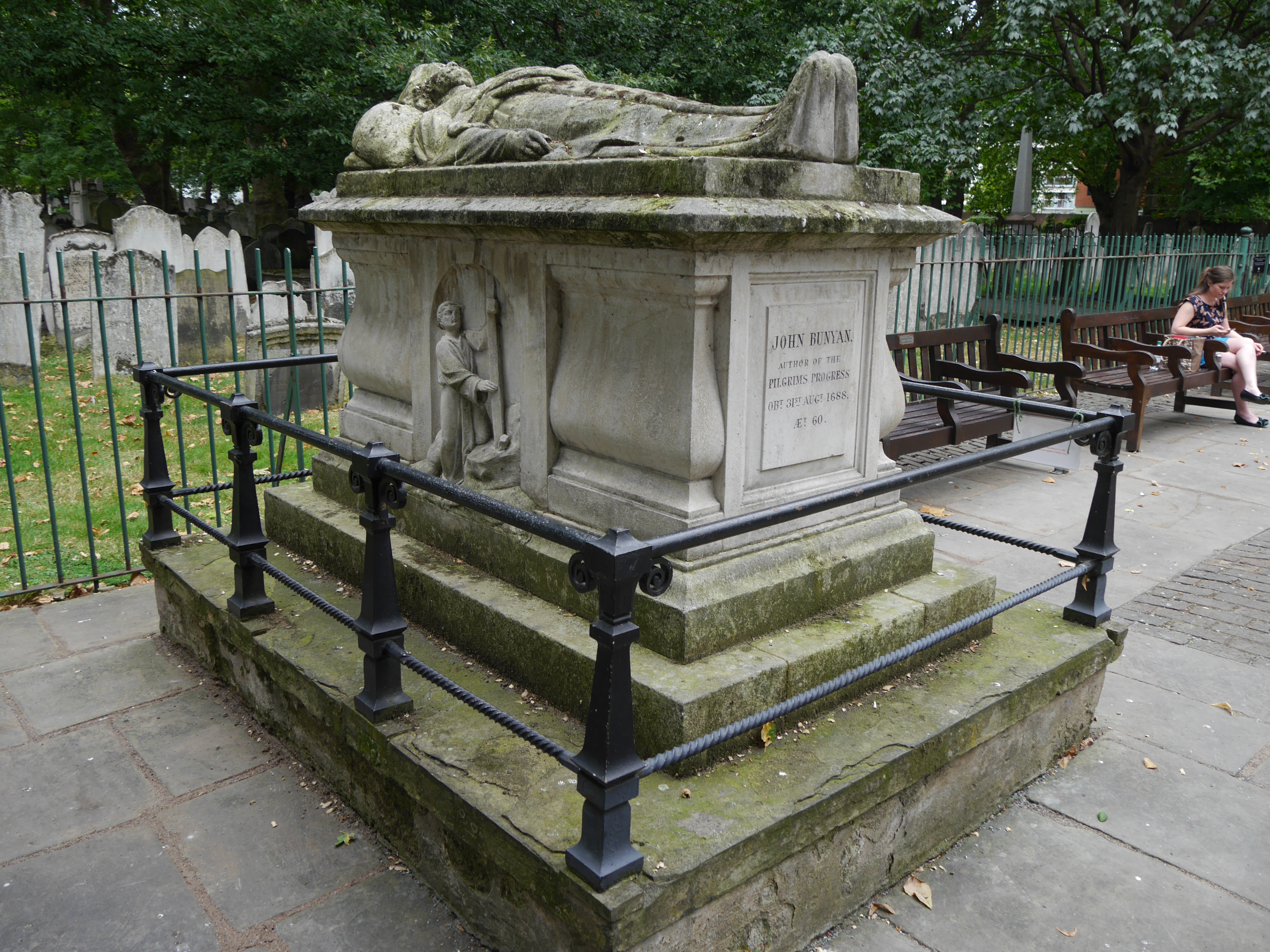
Tomb of John Bunyan (d.1688) in Bunhill Fields, London, remodelled by Papworth in 1862

Edgar early exhibited talents for drawing, modelling, and design in sculpture, and at an early age was placed as a pupil with Edward Hodges Baily. He was living at the time at the house of his uncle, the architect John Buonarotti Papworth. He was entered, on 15 December 1826, at the age of seventeen, as a student of the Royal Academy of Arts; in December 1829 he obtained the silver medal for a model from the antique; in December 1831 another silver medal for a figure; December 1833 the gold medal for a group of Leucothea presenting the scarf to Ulysses; and in 1834 he received a travelling scholarship of the academy. In 1836 he sent from Rome a Psyche. He returned home in 1837 in ill-health, but exhibited in 1838 a head of Flora, and another of Psyche.

While in Rome he made sketches for a panorama of that city; these he enlarged, and exhibited about 1844 for a short time in a gallery in Great Portland Street. He etched Original Sculptural Designs, which he had executed in Rome, and published them in folio in 1840.

Meanwhile, he continued to exhibit, chiefly busts, statuettes, and sketch designs, sent from his studio in Seymour Street, St Pancras. The most popular of his ideal works were "Adam and Eve", executed for Mr Foster-White, treasurer to St Bartholomew's Hospital; "The Woman of Samaria", for Mr James Brand; and (1856) "The Moabitish Maiden", a commission from Albert, the Prince Consort. Among the numerous busts of eminent men he executed those of John Hanning Speke, of Sir Richard Burton, and of Admiral Robert Blake, erected in the shire hall in Taunton. In 1862 he was responsible for the restoration and remodelling of the tomb of John Bunyan in Bunhill Fields, London. In the competition of June and July 1857 for a monument to the Duke of Wellington in St Paul's Cathedral his model received the third prize of £300, out of eighty-three designs submitted; that by Alfred Stevens (the design eventually installed) was one of the five receiving £100 each.

He exhibited sculptures at the Royal Academy from 1832 to 1866. His works were drawn from historical, literary and genre themes. Most are now lost, and are known only from their titles and from illustrations. Titles include "The Bird's Nester" (1857), "An Incident in the Siege of Lucknow" (1858), and in 1859 "The Young Emigrant" and "The Bride".

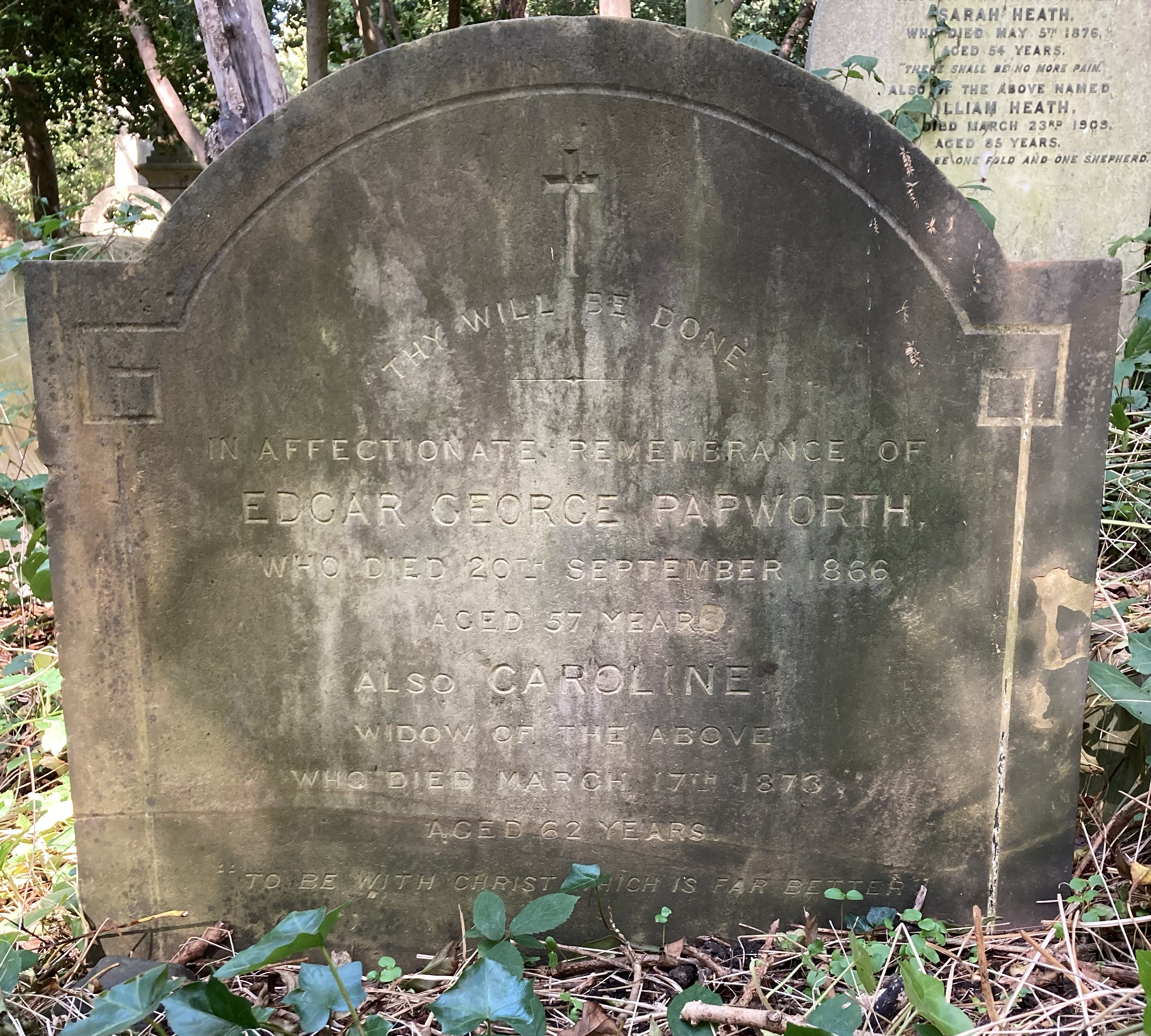
Headstone of Papworth and his widow Caroline in Highgate Cemetery

== Later life and death ==
In his later years Papworth experienced financial difficulties owing to his extravagant and careless habits. He died on 20 September 1866 at his home in Dorset Square, aged 65, and was buried on 25 September on the western side of Highgate Cemetery.

== Personal life ==
In 1831, Papworth married Caroline Baily, daughter of his first master Edward Hodges Baily. She died in 1873. His eldest son, Edgar George Papworth Junior, also became a sculptor.
