= John Southby (c. 1652 – 1741) =

English Member of Parliament

John Southby (c. 1650 – 1741), of Carswell Manor, Buckland, Berkshire (now Oxfordshire), was an English Member of Parliament for Abingdon in 1689–90.
