= Bert Papworth =

British trade unionist (1899–1980)

- Born: 8 February 1899; London, England
- Died: 18 May 1980 (aged 81)
- Employer(s): Royal Arsenal, London General Omnibus Company
- Organization(s): National Association of Discharged Sailors and Soldiers, Transport and General Workers' Union (TGWU), Trades Union Congress (TUC), London Transport Friendly Society
- Political party: Labour Party (UK)
- Other political affiliations: Communist Party of Great Britain (CPGB)
- Movement: Busmen's Rank and File Movement
- Spouse: Betty Papworth

Albert Frederick Papworth (8 February 1899 – 18 May 1980), often known as Pappy, was a British trade unionist. A leader of several strikes, he later became the first communist to serve on the General Council of the Trades Union Congress.

== Biography ==
Born in London, Papworth began working part-time from the age of eight. He first joined a trade union when he was 16, and led a strike at Morgan Crucible during World War I, while still a teenager. He then transferred to work at the Woolwich Arsenal, where he was involved in two separate strikes. In 1918, he joined the British Army, serving briefly before the end of the war.

Papworth returned to civilian work at the end of the war, and joined the Labour Party and the National Association of Discharged Sailors and Soldiers. He struggled to find regular work until 1927, when he began working as a bus conductor with the London General Omnibus Company, based at Putney. He joined the Transport and General Workers' Union (TGWU), soon becoming secretary of his local branch.

The London General Omnibus Company announced pay cuts for staff in 1932. Leaders of the TGWU reluctantly agreed, but a significant minority of bus workers strongly opposed the agreement. Papworth, along with Bill Jones, Bill Payne and Frank Snelling, founded the Busmen's Rank and File Movement, which published Busmen's Punch and held meetings at bus garages around London. Many leading figures in the movement also held membership of the Communist Party of Great Britain (CPGB), and Papworth became increasingly sympathetic to the party, although he did not immediately join.

In 1935, Papworth was elected to the Executive Council of the TGWU, a position which no communist had held. The following year, the Rank and File Movement led a campaign for a seven-hour working day and improved conditions of employment. When managers refused to negotiate, they launched a strike. The busmen's strike was unsuccessful, and its leaders, including Papworth and Bill Jones, were expelled from the TGWU early in 1937. This spurred Papworth to join the CPGB, and he also spent a few months visiting Spain to observe the Republican side in the Spanish Civil War. He spoke on behalf of the Republicans upon returning to the UK. He was also active in opposition to the British Union of Fascists.

During World War II, Papworth was readmitted to the TGWU, and he again served on the executive committee of the TGWU from 1941. In 1944, he was also elected to the General Council of the Trades Union Congress (TUC), the first communist to sit on the body. Through this, he travelled with Vincent Tewson and Vic Feather to investigate trade unionism in Greece, finding that the ruling Junta had imprisoned most trade union leaders.

From the start of 1950, the TGWU banned CPGB members from holding offices in the union, so Papworth lost his official positions. He instead devoted his time to the London Transport Friendly Society, of which he was secretary from 1951 until 1964.

== Personal life and death ==
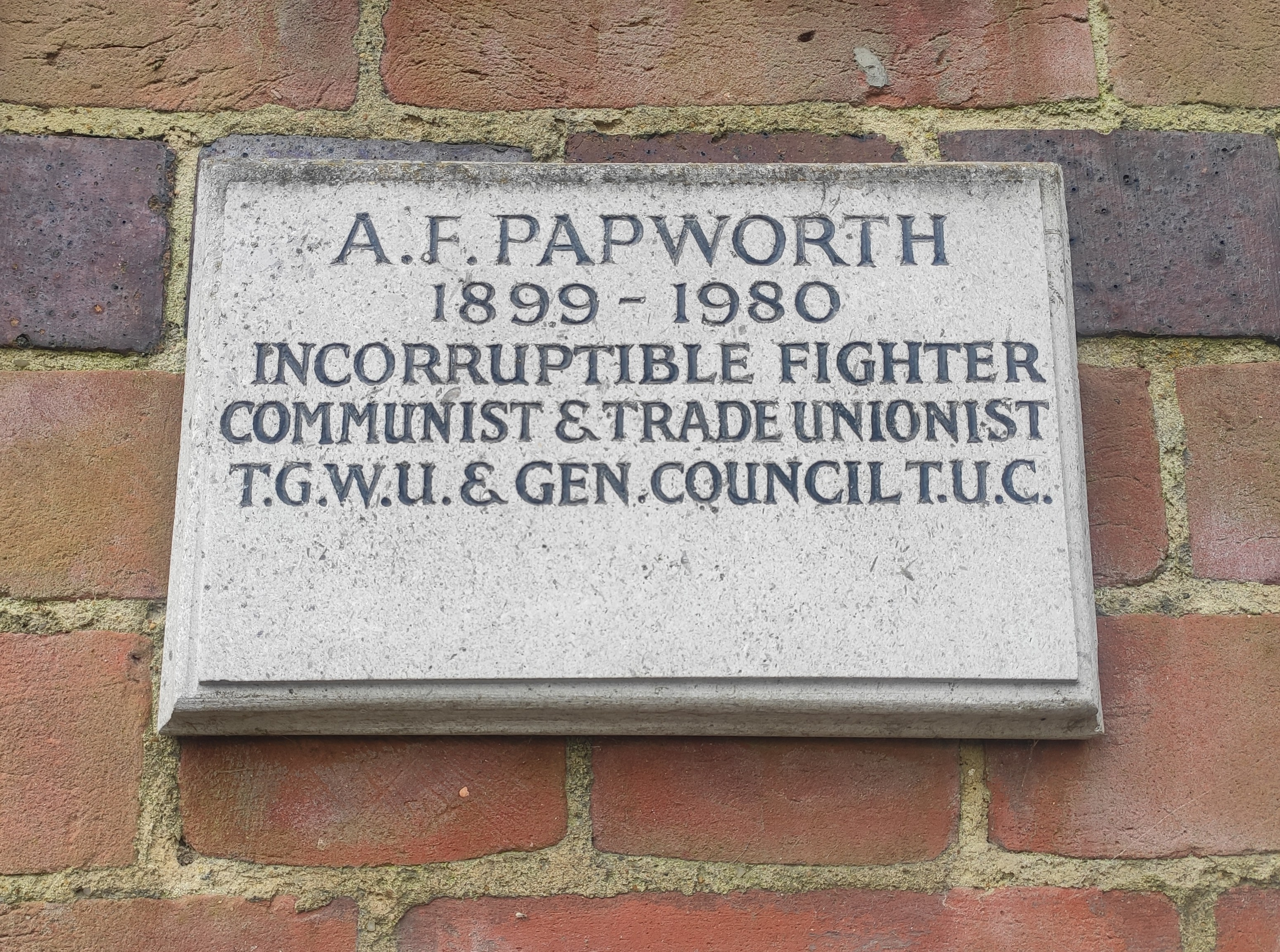
Plaque dedicated to Papworth at Golders Green Crematorium

Papworth was married to British communist, anti-nuclear activist, and anti-war activist Betty Papworth.

Bert Papworth died on 18 May 1980. He was cremated at Golders Green Crematorium.
