= Teschenite =

Type of igneous rock

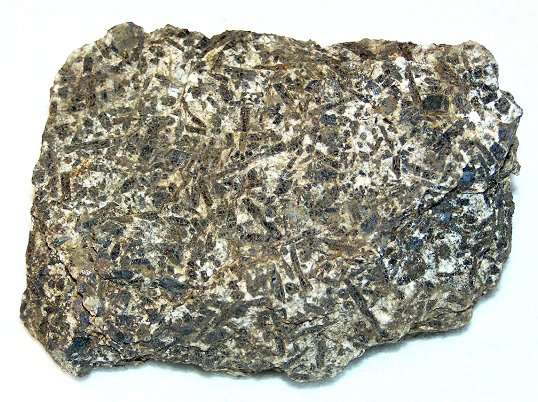
Sample of teschenite from Poland

Teschenite is a type of coarse or medium grained igneous rock, akin to gabbro or dolerite, that contains essential analcime. Its name is derived from the region of Teschen, where it was discovered. The term crinanite has previously been used as a synonym for teschenite (particularly for deposits with increased analcime content), but there have been attempts to standardise terminology by stopping its use. Rocks related to teschenite are referred to as rocks of the teschenite association.

== Geological composition ==
Teschenite is typically composed of essential titan-augite, analcime, labradorite and small quantities of olivine and may include hornblendes; the presence of analcime is a key characteristic of teschenites and its presence is a factor that differentiates it from other similar rocks.

Teschenite also has subtypes such as cuyamite and lugarite.

== History ==
Teschenite was first described and named by Ludwig Hohenegger in 1861. Hohenegger used the term to describe Cretaceous masses of Austrian Silesia near Teschen, which up until that point were listed as a range of minerals, such as diorite, diabase, greenstone or flood basalt, among others. Later in 1866 Hohenegger's definition of the mineral was further refined by Gustav Tschermak, who differentiated between the darker, basalt-like deposits rich in olivine and what is now called teschenite as he identified the former as picrite.

Until 1892 the name in use for the rock was tchesenit, which is derived from the German name for Český Těšín. The name teschenite (těšínit in Czech) was first used by mineralogist Josef Klvaňa

== Location of occurrence ==
Teschenite has been found in many parts of the world, some examples include Scotland, Portugal, the Caucasus Mountains, Siberia, Kenya, Myanmar, Taiwan, Australia and New Zealand.

In the Czech Republic, teschenite is primarily found in the volcanic region of the Beskids which stretch from the borders of Moravia to regions east of Český Těšín. Specific documented deposits are in Tichá, in the basin of the Ostravice river, in the Řepiště municipality and in a quarry near Žermanice Reservoir. Historically, olivine-rich teschenite has also been mined in an old quarry in Straník.

== See also ==
- Picrite, a basalt similar to teschenite.
- Lugarite, a rock-type containing teschnite.
