= Manor of Papworth =

Manor in Surrey, England

The Manor of Papworth is located in the parish of Send with Ripley, Surrey, England. It has also been known historically as the Manor of Papeworth, Paperworth, Paperworth Court, and Papeworth Cross, among other names. Its history is intricately connected with that of the manors of Send, Dedswell, and West Clandon.

== Origins ==
The history of the Manor of Papworth is intricately connected with that of the manors of Send, Dedswell and West Clandon and the families that owned them. Like Dedswell, Papworth may be derived from the holding of Walter or Herbert recorded in the Domesday Book in 1086, but the matter is uncertain. Papworth has had various names over the centuries, including the Manor of Papeworth, Paperworth, Paperworth Court, and Papeworth Cross.

== History of the manor ==
The first lord of the manor was William de Weston (died c. 1353), lord of West Clandon. The manor then passed through the Slyfelde family before returning to the Westons in the 1600s. It was then in the hands of the King family and subsequently the Onslows until 1984. The first Earl of Onslow acquired it in 1783 in exchange for the nearby Manor of Wisley.

The 33rd lord of the manor was Lieutenant Colonel John Walter Molyneux-Child who acquired it by inheritance in 1984 with the neighbouring Manor of Dedswell from the trustees of the 6th Earl of Onslow (died 1971), and in succession to the 7th Earl of Onslow (died 2011) who relinquished the titles in that year. Acquiring the manors kindled Molyneux-Child's interest in their history and in the history of the manorial system generally and he began to research the subject and wrote a book of his findings, The evolution of the English manorial system, that was published in 1987. Molyneux-Child exercised his right as lord of the manor to appoint manorial officials such as ale tasters and hangmen which he combined with fund-raising for charity. Following Molyneux-Child's death in 2015, the manor passed to his eldest son Patrick Molyneux-Child.

== Manor house ==
The Papworth manor house, now known as Papercourt Farm House, dates to the sixteenth and seventeenth centuries with a twentieth century extension, and is a grade II listed building with Historic England. It is on the edge of the River Wey floodplain and adjacent to Papercourt Lane. As far as is known, the only lord of the manor to occupy the house was William de Weston in 1331.
