= St Hugh's School, Faringdon =

Coordinates: 51°40′38″N 1°31′47″W

St Hugh's School
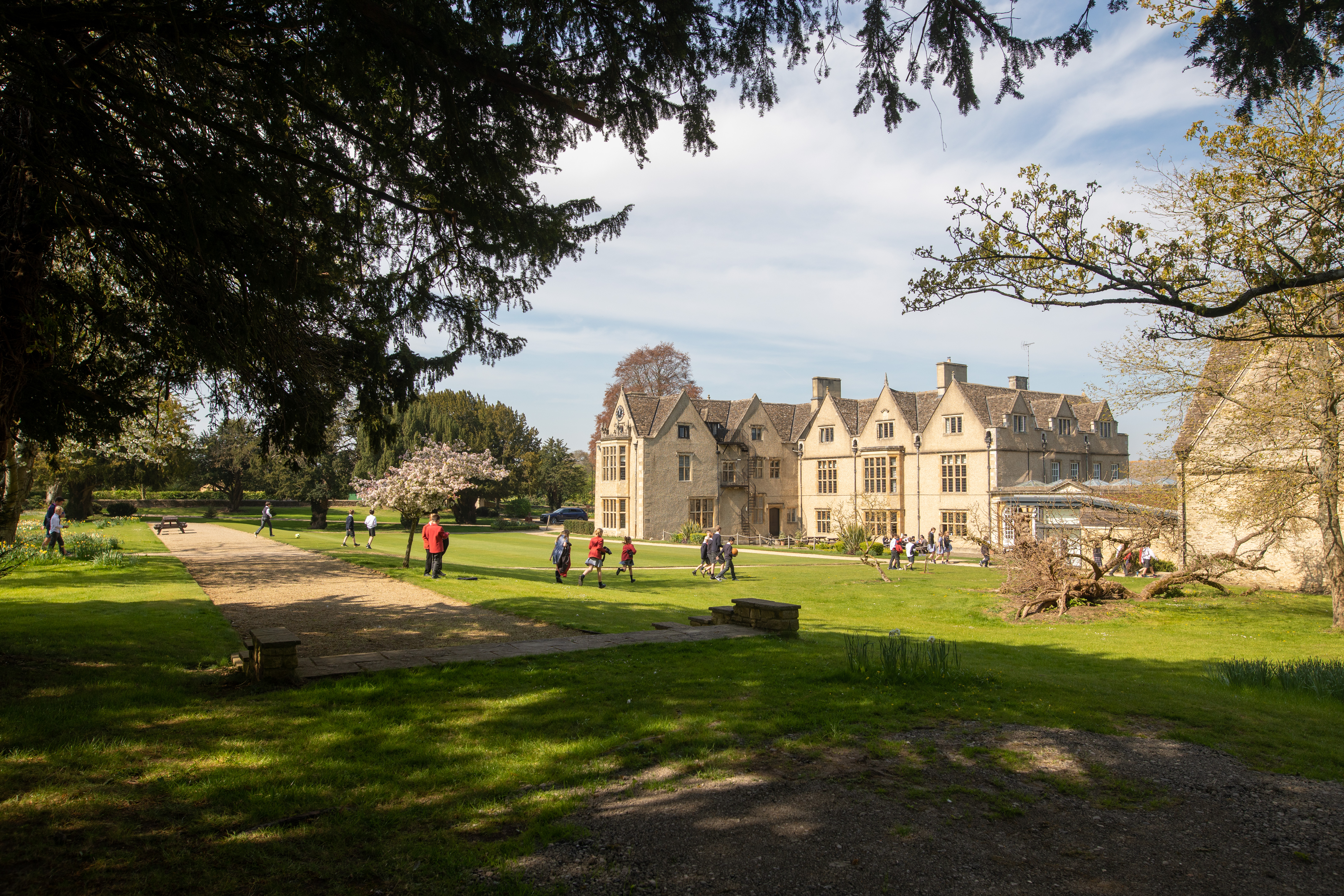
- Carswell, Oxfordshire, SN7 8PT; England

Information
- Type: Preparatory and Senior school (day and boarding)
- Religious affiliation: Church of England
- Established: 1906
- Local authority: Oxfordshire
- Department for Education URN: 123299 Tables
- Headmaster: David W Griffiths
- Gender: Coeducational
- Age: 3 to 16
- Enrollment: c. 350
- Houses: 4
- Website: www.st-hughs.co.uk

St Hugh's School is a preparatory school and senior school near Faringdon in Oxfordshire. The school is co-educational and has 350 pupils aged 3–16 years. The school offers day and boarding for children to 13, and day school for children up to 16.

== History ==
St Hugh's was established at Morland House, Chislehurst, Kent, in 1906, before moving to Lamas House (which became a hospital during the First World War) and then Widmore Court in nearby Bickley, then in Kent. During the Second World War the school was evacuated to Malvern Wells in Worcestershire.

During the school's absence from Kent, its buildings became the temporary wartime offices of Hodder & Stoughton. However, these were destroyed by a V-1 "Doodlebug" in the early morning of 27 June 1944. The school did not, therefore, return to Kent after the war but relocated to Carswell Manor then in Berkshire, a Jacobean country house with grounds.

The school bears the name of Hugh of Avalon, Bishop of Lincoln from 1181 to 1200. It is a member of the Independent Association of Preparatory Schools and is administered as a charitable educational trust by a board of governors. For many years St Hugh's was solely a boys' full boarding school but since 1977 it has also taught girls.

In March 2026, St Hugh's announced the purchase of an additional 20 acres of land adjacent to the school. This land will allow for the creation of additional sports spaces and a new school farm to open in the academic year 2026-2027.

== Notable former pupils ==
- Paramasiva Prabhakar Kumaramangalam Chief of the Army Staff (India)
