= Betty Papworth =

British communist and anti-war activist (1914–2008)

- Papworth in 1998
- Born: 1914; Stepney, London, England
- Died: July 2008 (aged 94)
- Burial place: Golders Green Crematorium, London, England
- Occupations: communist and anti-war activist
- Organisation(s): Campaign for Nuclear Disarmament, Stop the War Coalition
- Political party: Communist Party of Great Britain
- Spouse: Bert Papworth

Betty Papworth (1914 – July 2008) was a British communist and anti-war activist. She was a member of the Campaign for Nuclear Disarmament (CND) and Stop the War Coalition.

== Biography ==
Papworth was born into a large Jewish family in 1914 in Stepney, in the East End of London. She married Transport and General Workers Union official Bert Papworth.

With the rise of the British Union of Fascists, Papworth became a member of the Stepney branch of the Communist Party of Great Britain (CPGB) and took part in the Battle of Cable Street in 1936. In 1938, she visited the Soviet Union (USSR). She was a member of an Aid For Spain committee during the Spanish Civil War, through which she befriended the American actor, singer and political activist Paul Robeson.

During World War II, Papworth worked making gyroscope compasses at the London Sperry aircraft factory. After the 1941 Nazi invasion of the Soviet Union, in 1942 she asked guests at her nephew's bar mitzvah to donate money to the Aid For Russia campaign. After the war, she ran the family clothing company in Cricklewood and remained politically active, as one of the first members of the Campaign for Nuclear Disarmament (CND).

In later life, Papworth joined the Stop the War Coalition, learned the Russian language and sold the Greater London Pensioners Association newsletter outside Parliament weekly. In 2004, she travelled to Israel with Islington North MP Jeremy Corbyn to witness the release of the Israeli peace activist and whistle-blower Mordechai Vanunu from prison.

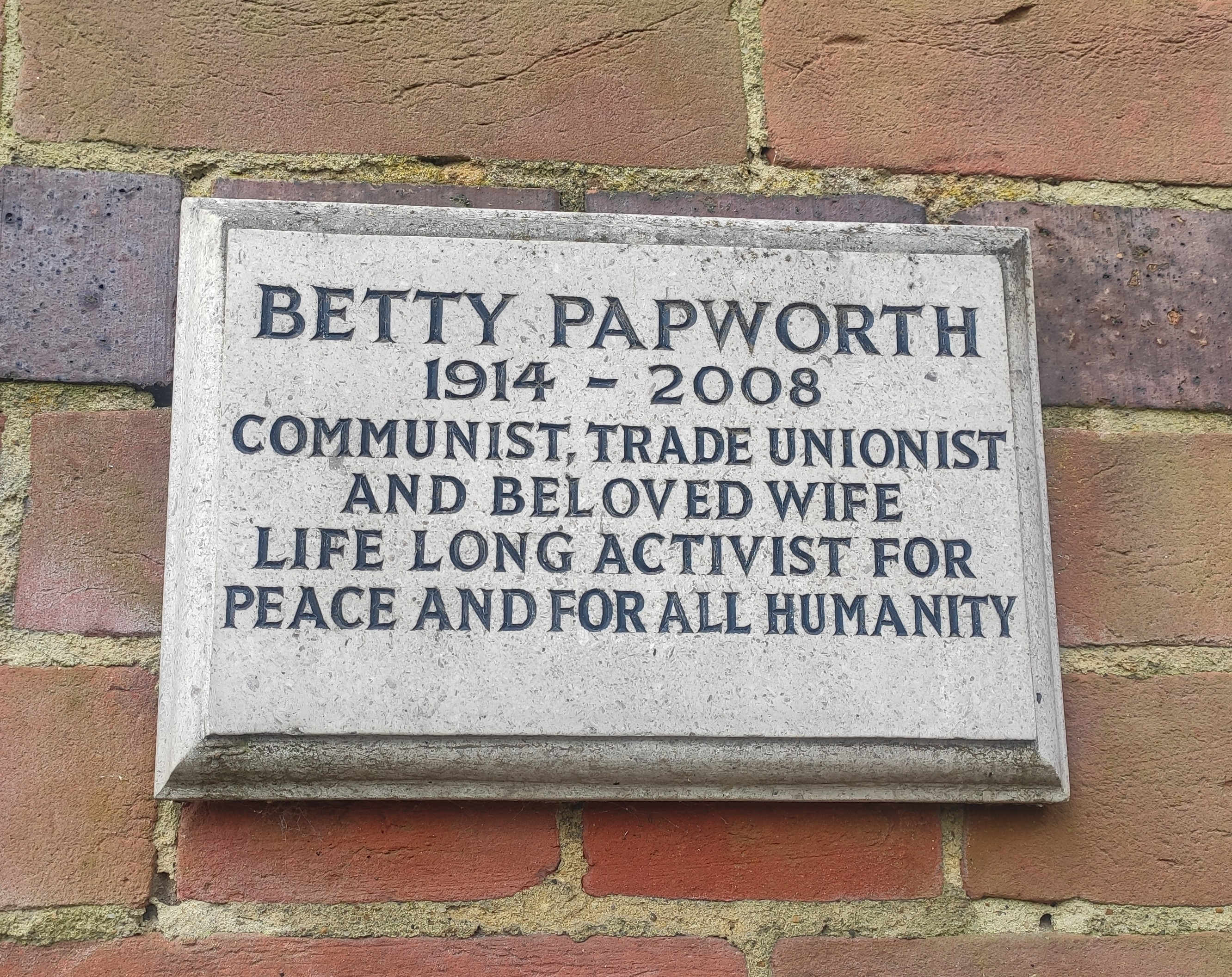
Commemorative plaque at Golders Green Crematorium

Papworth died in July 2008. She was cremated and her ashes were buried at Golders Green Crematorium.

== See also ==
- List of peace activists
