= Carswell Manor =

Country house in Oxfordshire, England

Coordinates: 51.6772°N 1.5297°W

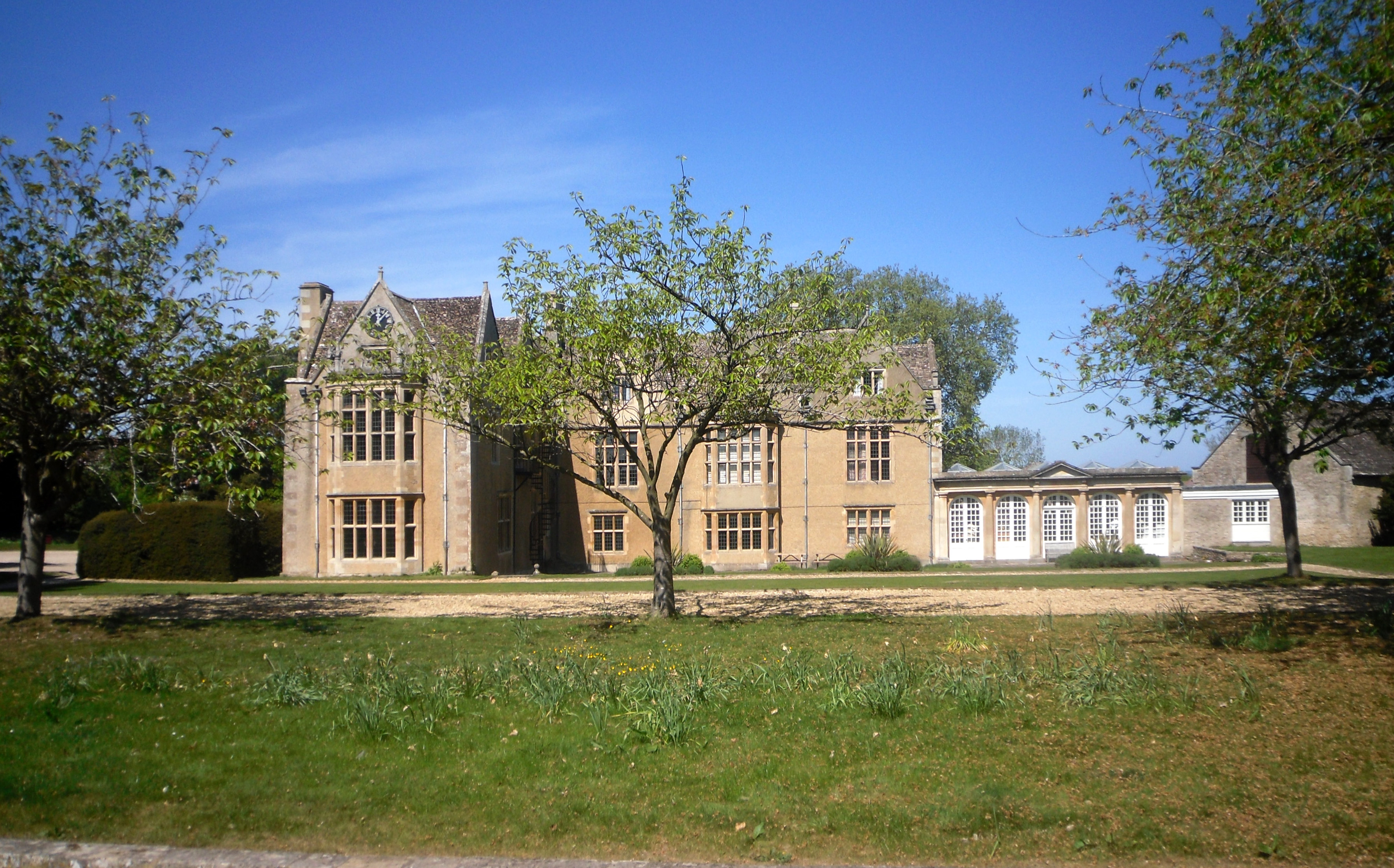
Carswell Manor

Carswell Manor is a Jacobean country house at Carswell in the civil parish of Buckland in the English county of Oxfordshire (formerly in Berkshire). It is just north of the A420 road between Swindon and Oxford.

== The manor of Carswell ==
The manorial estate of Carswell was occupied by the St Philibert family and their tenant Richard Hake, until 1358 when it was quitclaimed by Sir John de St Philibert to King Edward III. It then descended to King Richard II, who granted it to his Queen, Anne, in 1383. Anne granted it to her Chamberlain Sir Richard de Abberbury, who received the reversion in fee from the King in 1385, and in 1393 Sir Richard sold Carswell to Sir Peter Bessels and his mother Katherine, who already held another manor in the same parish. During the fifteenth century it descended in a troubled course through the Bessels family to William Bessels (died 1515). His daughter and heir Elizabeth made her first marriage to Richard Fettiplace, and the manor descended by 1584 to Bessel Fettiplace, who in that year sold it to John Southby the elder (died 1599), "Yeoman". From him it passed to his son Richard Southby and to Richard's son John Southby the younger, who sat as MP in the First and Second Protectorate Parliament: it descended in the Southby family (through Richard Southby MP and John Southby MP) until the late 19th century.

== The manor house ==
The three-storey manor house dates back to the early 17th century. It is constructed mainly of Cotswold stone and surrounded by mature woodland. Within the extensive grounds there is a ha-ha. There is also a dovecote dating from 1619 which is purported to be the first square dovecote built in Berkshire. The house and dovecote are both Grade II listed on the National Heritage List for England.

The house was probably built for John Southby who was High Sheriff of Berkshire in 1646/7 and MP for Berkshire in 1654–56. His family had occupied the manor and lived on the site since 1584, and continued there until 1892.

== Victorian expansion and later history ==
The buildings were extensively restored and remodelled between 1893 and 1898 by William Niven (1846-1921), an architect who had designed the Gothic revival church of St Alban in Teddington. Niven's son (the father of the actor David Niven) then bought the house to be his country seat. The Niven family's crest and motto are still set in stone above the front porch. The Niven family sold the property shortly after David's birth.

The house was bought by Captain Francis Mourilyan Butler and his wife Josephine (née Lawrence), the daughter of Joseph Jeremiah Lawrence of New London, Connecticut whose father founded Miner, Lawrence and Co. and the National Whaling Bank. In October 1917, during World War I, Captain Butler was killed near Ypres. His only son (Francis Charles Joseph Butler), born in 1915, was brought up at Carswell Manor and became a noted aviator. In June 1940, whilst serving as a Pilot Officer in the RAFVR, the younger Francis went missing in action. This led to the legal case "Butler's Settlement Trust, Lloyds Bank Ltd. v. Ford" (as to whether being reported missing was sufficient evidence of death) and ultimately led to the sale of the property. There are memorials to both father and son in nearby Buckland church.

== School ==
Since 1945, Carswell Manor has been the home of St Hugh's School, an exclusive preparatory school which moved there from Malvern, where it had been evacuated during the war.
