= Jean-Pierre Minckelers =

Dutch academic and inventor

- Jan Pieter Minckelers
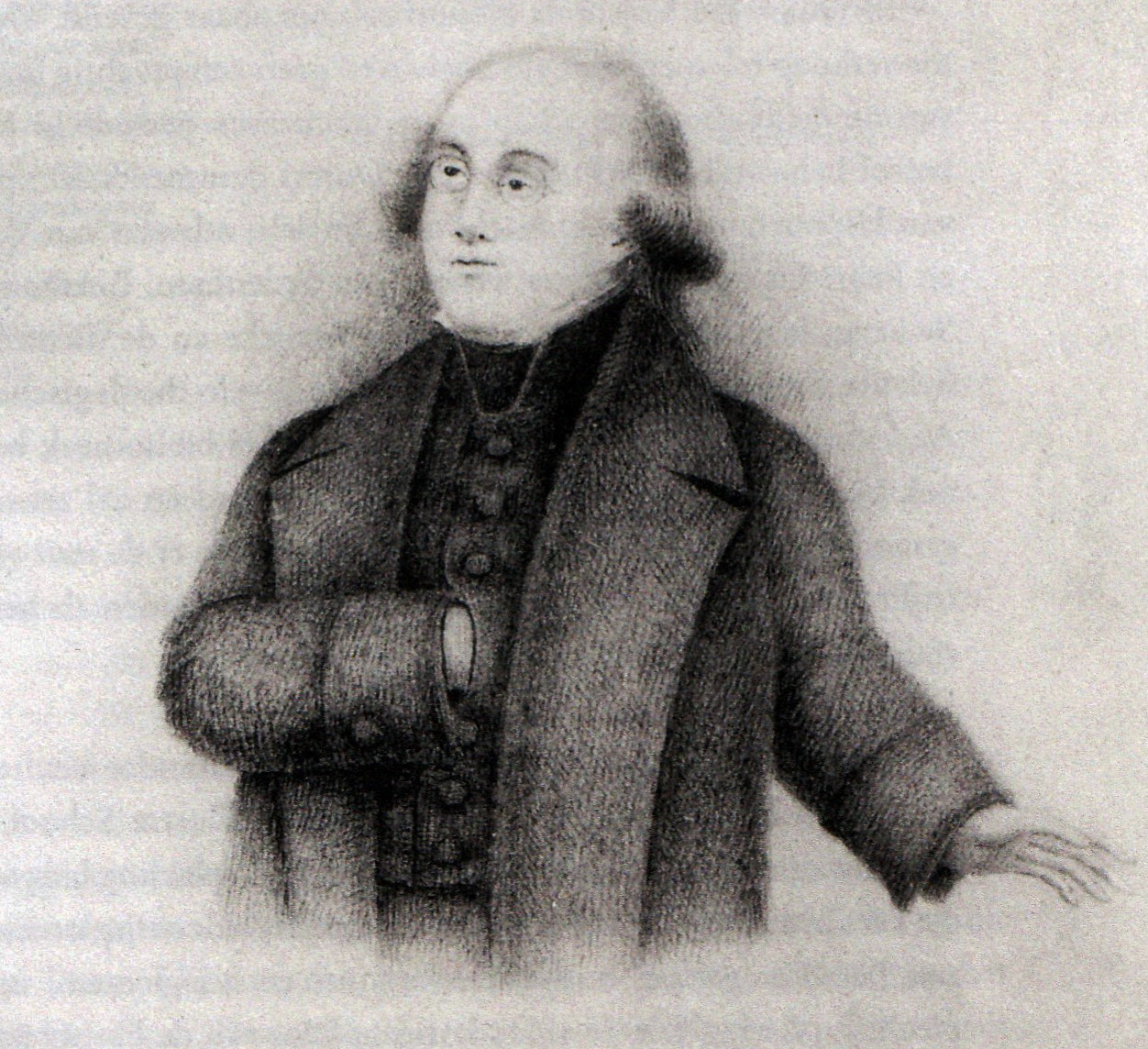
- Lithograph of Jan Pieter Minckelers, by Jan Brabant (ca. 1850)
- Born: Joannes Petrus Minckelers; 2 December 1748; Maastricht, Dutch Republic
- Died: 24 July 1824 (aged 75); Maastricht, United Kingdom of the Netherlands
- Known for: inventor of coal gasification and gas lighting

Academic background
- Education: physics and theology
- Alma mater: University of Leuven
- Academic advisor: François-Jean Thysbaert
- Influences: possibly Alessandro Volta

Academic work
- Discipline: experimental physics of gasses
- Institutions: University of Leuven

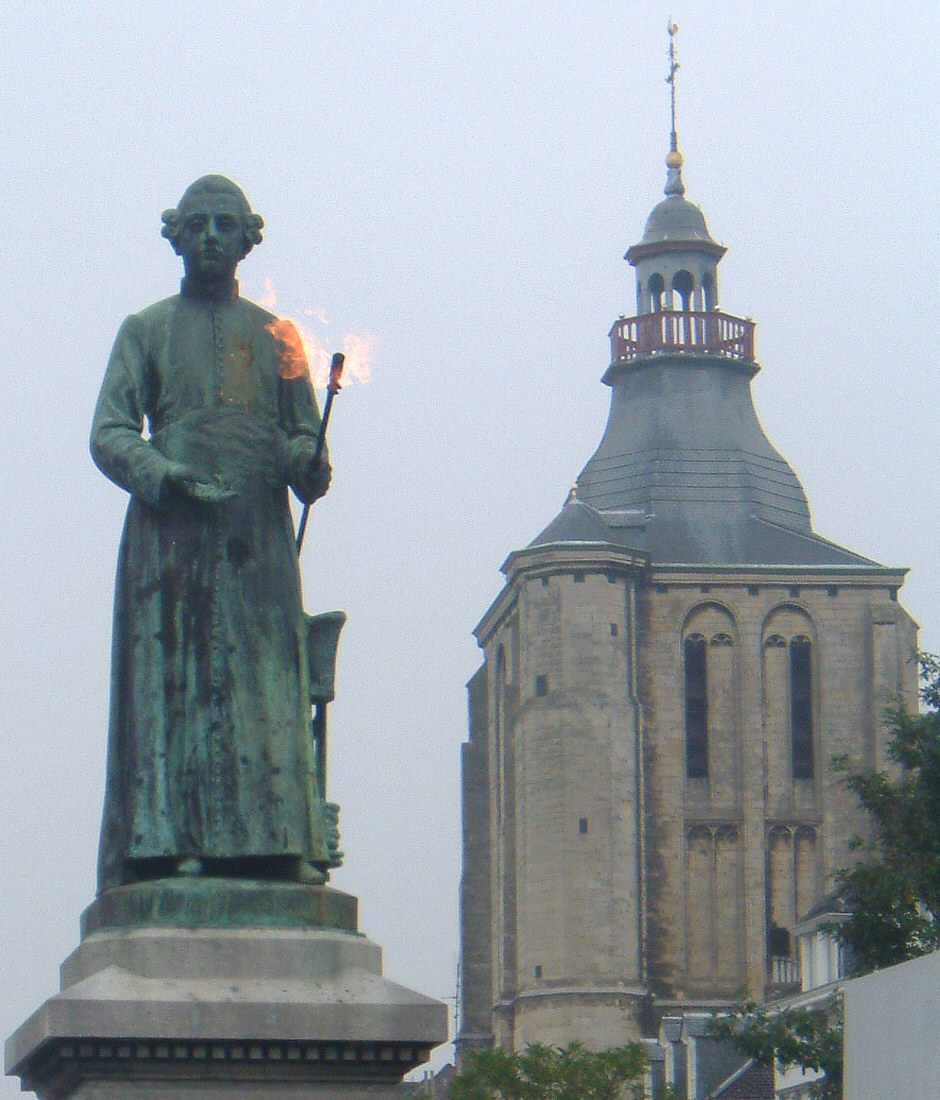
Statue of Minckelers with "eternal burning flame" in Maastricht

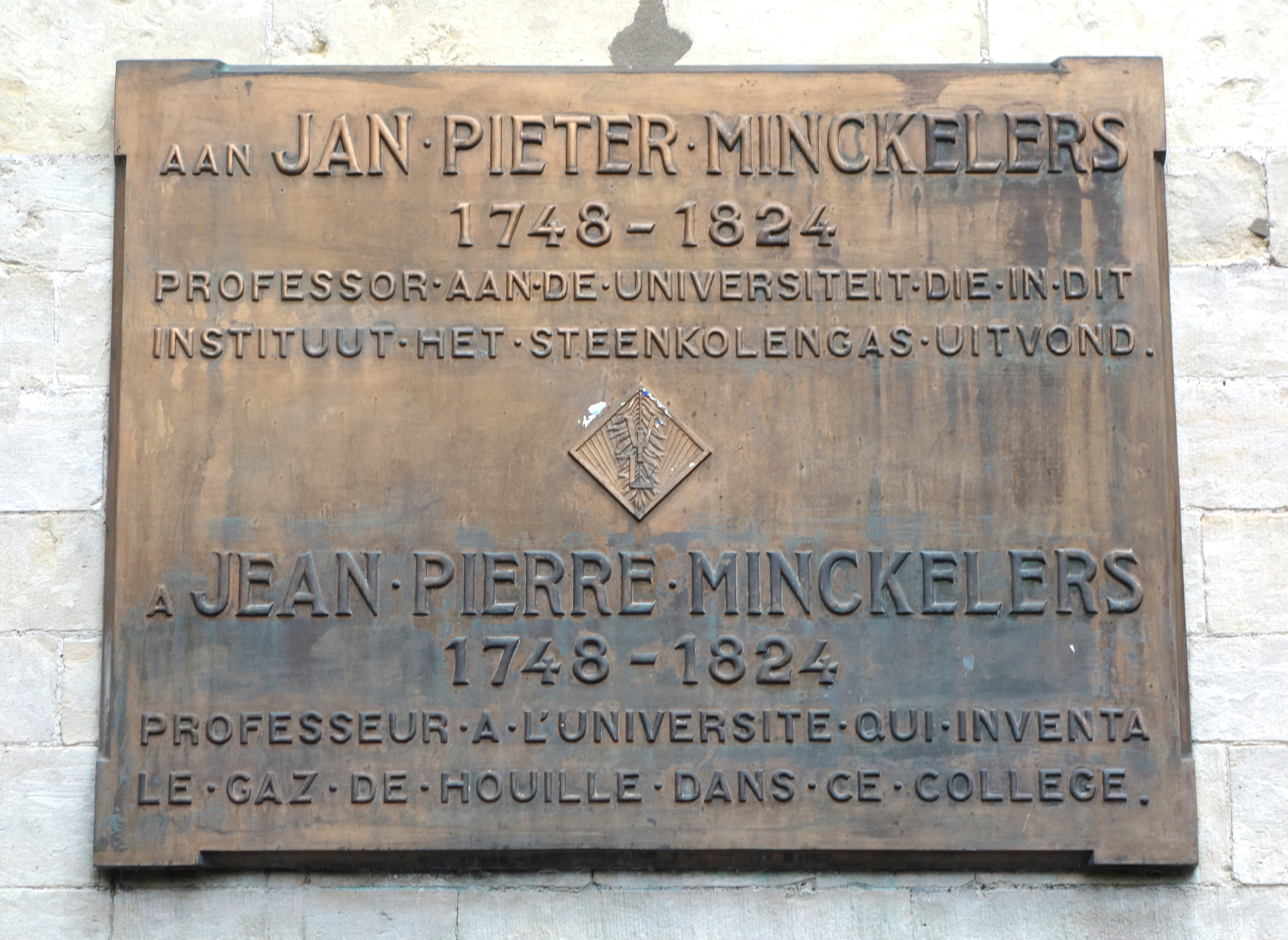
Memorial plaque at the Catholic University of Leuven

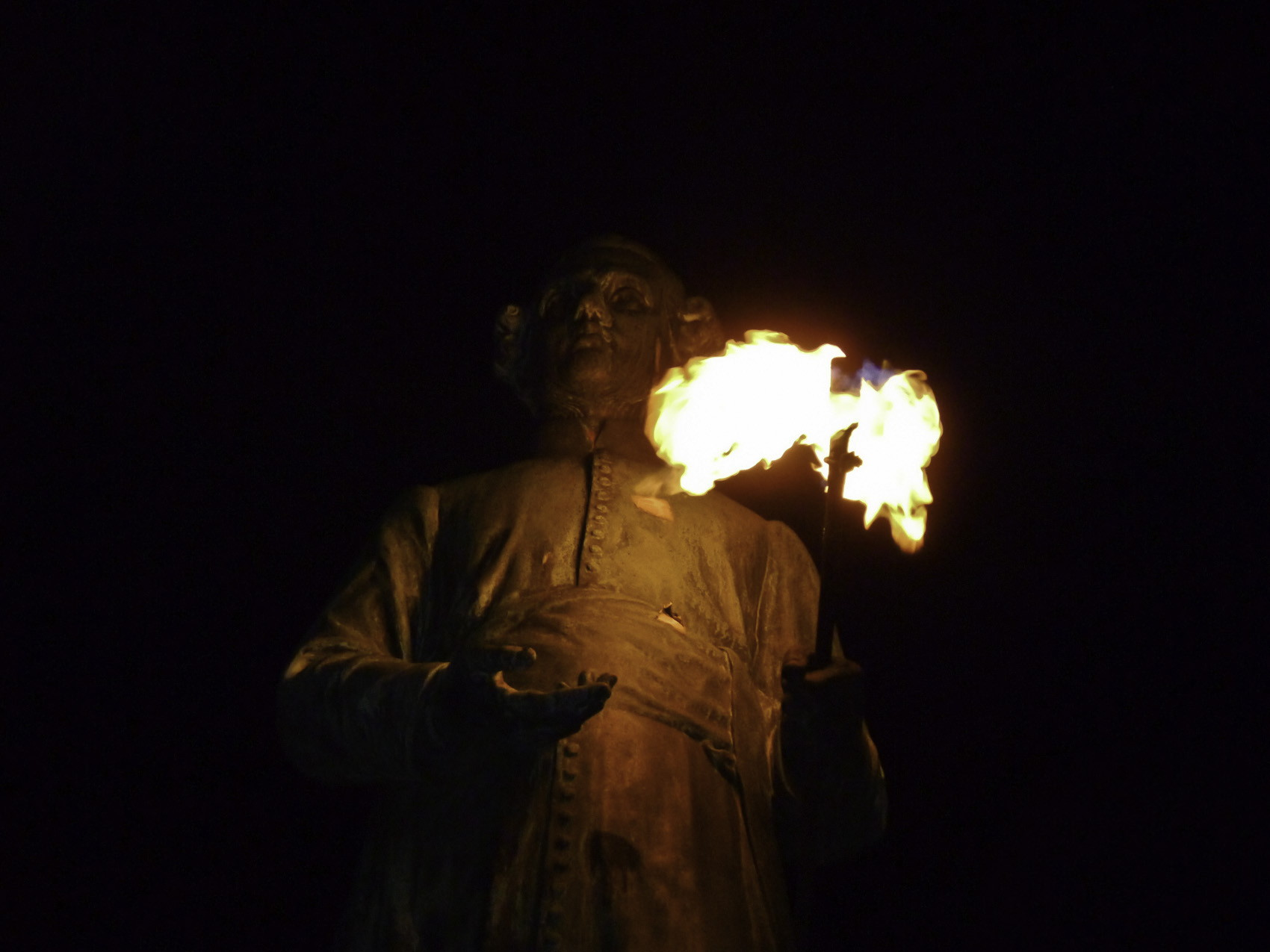
Statue of Jean-Pierre Minckelers at night

Jean-Pierre or Jan Pieter Minckelers (also Minkelers, Minckeleers; 1748–1824) was a Dutch academic and inventor of coal gasification and illuminating gas.

Minckelers was the son of Anna Margaretha Denis en Laurens Michael Minckelers, a pharmacist in Maastricht. After finishing Latin school in his hometown at the age of 15, he went to the University of Leuven (French: Louvain), where he studied theology and philosophy at the Collegium Falconis. In 1771 he became a deacon and the next year he became professor of natural philosophy. From 1778 Minckelers focussed on the study of gasses. He worked closely with Jan Frans Thijsbaert (Jean-François Thysbaert; 1736–1825), director of the school of experimental physics at the university, and it was under Thysbaert's direction that he did his experiments on coal gas.

In the early 1780s the question of aerostats and Montgolfier balloons was occupying the mind of scientists, and Louis Engelbert, 6th Duke of Arenberg, a promoter of science and art, engaged Minckelers, Thysbaert en Carolus van Bochaute, a third natural philosopher at the university, to address the question of the best gas for balloon purposes. In 1784, after many experiments, Minckelers published a work entitled Mémoire sur l'air inflammable tiré de différentes substances, rédigé par M. Minkelers, professeur de philosophie au collège du Faucon, université de Louvain (Louvain, 1784). As an appendix to this memoir there was a Table de gravités spécifiques des différentes espèces d'air by Thysbaert.

In his memoir Minckelers relates how he made his discovery: from the very beginning of his experiments he had had the idea of enclosing oil in the barrel of a gun and heating it in a forge. Under action of the heat the oil dissolved and gave way to a very light gas, having other advantageous qualities. Having proved that oil gas was the best for balloons, Minckelers used it for many balloons which rose rapidly and travelled great distances in the neighbourhood of Leuven in 1783. According to his pupil von Hulstein, who was in his class in 1785, Minckelers at times used this same gas to light his lecture hall. Later on some students' bedrooms were lit by gas as well. Moreover, the drift of his memoir proves clearly that in its inventor's eyes the great combustibility of the gas was one of its leading qualities. When Joseph II, in 1788, transferred the Catholic University of Leuven to Brussels, Minckelers continued as professor. During the Brabant Revolution, Brussels was besieged and Minckelers was forced to flee, leaving his equipment behind. The gaslight apparatus is thought to have survived until World War I. As a supporter of the emperor, he could not regain his position when the University moved back to Leuven. He officially resigned in 1794 and was appointed professor of physics and chemistry at the Central School of Maastricht. While not at a center of higher learning, he proceeded to do research, among others on meteorology and on a Mosasaurus skeleton discovered in a local limestone quarry in 1800. In 1816 he became member of the Royal Institute of the Netherlands. He retired in 1818 and died six years later in his hometown of Maastricht.

Minckelers is remembered as an inventor of coal gasification and gas lighting and as the first to do this at a practical scale. On Maastricht's market square stands a statue, created by Bart van Hove, that carries an "eternal" gas light. For sustainability and budget reasons, the flame is coin operated since 2006. Another statue of him is in Heverlee near the science buildings of the Katholieke Universiteit Leuven. A number of schools and streets in the Netherlands and Belgium carry his name, including a street in the center of Leuven.

== Bibliography ==
  - P.A.Th.M. Jaspers, De ontwikkeling van de pharmacie in Limburg gedurende de Franse Tijd, Venlo: Dagblad voor Noord Limburg 1966, pp. 126, passim;
  - P.A.Th.M. Jaspers, J.P. Minckelers 1748-1824, Maastricht: Stichting Historische Reeks 1983;
  - H. Nabben, Lichter dan lucht, los van de aarde, Barneveld: BDU Uitgevers 2013.
