= Edgar George Papworth Junior =

English sculptor (1832–1927)

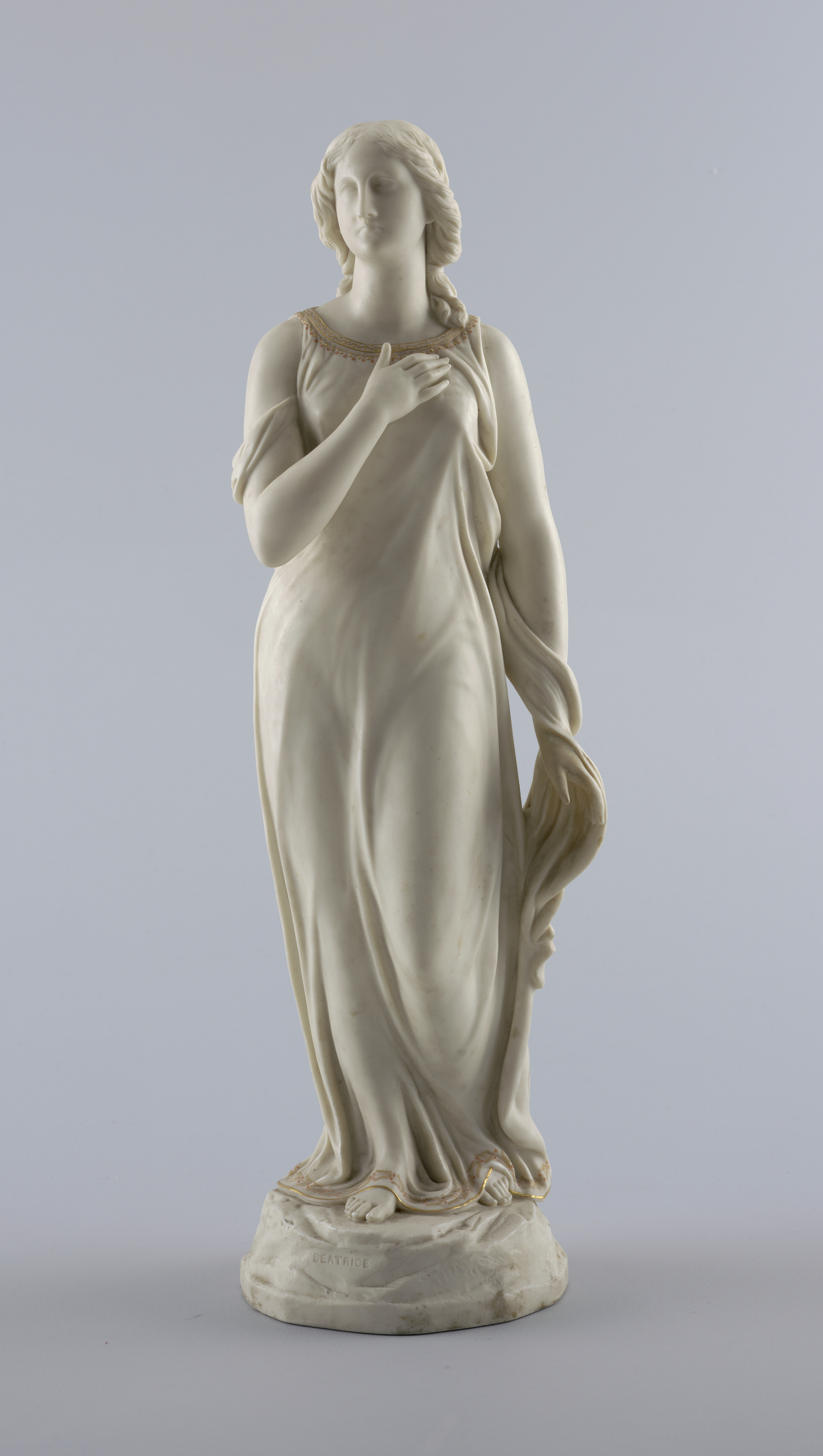
Beatrice Figure, 1860, made by Edgar George Papworth Jr., now in the Cooper Hewitt, Smithsonian Design Museum

Edgar George Papworth Jnr (25 June 1832 – 20 January 1927) was an English sculptor, who was popular in the later nineteenth century.

Papworth was born in the Marylebone district of London and came from a family long connected with stonework. His father was the sculptor Edgar George Papworth Senior (1809–66), and his grandfather Thomas Papworth (1773–1814), a stuccoist. His mother, Caroline, was the daughter of the sculptor Edward Hodges Baily.

Papworth, Junior showed more than fifty portrait busts at the Royal Academy between 1852 and 1882. In 1870, Papworth was chosen to make a statue of the Birmingham industrialist Josiah Mason, but Mason vetoed the proposal, and Papworth was paid 150 guineas in compensation. Eventually, a statue of Mason was created posthumously, by Francis John Williamson. Papworth's work then fell out of fashion, and he was not mentioned in a list of English sculptors compiled in 1901. He died at Bexleyheath, where he had lived since about 1911.
