= Alfa Romeo 110A =

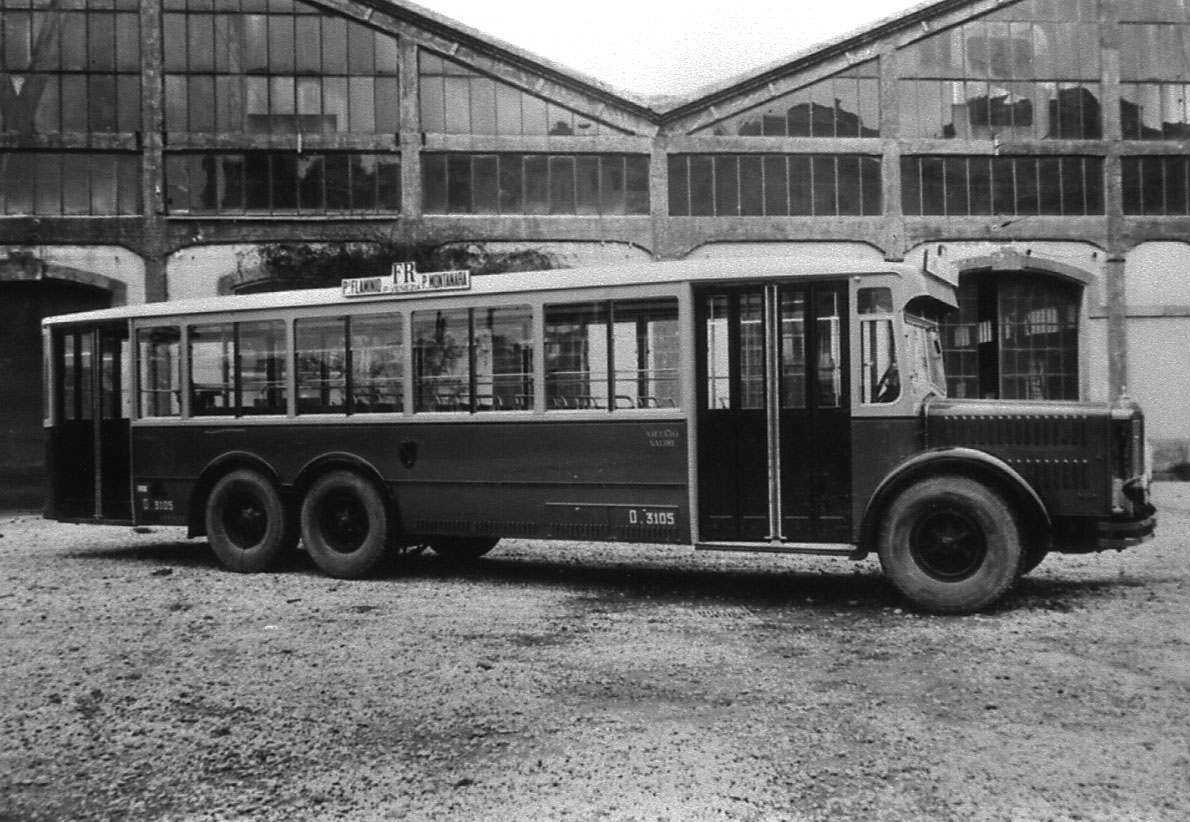

Dimensions
- Wheelbase: 110 AC: 5,010 mm (197.2 in); 110 A: 5,910 mm (232.7 in)
- Length: 110 AC: 10 m (394 in); 110 A: 12 m (472 in)

Alfa Romeo 110A is model of autobus produced from Alfa Romeo between 1934 and 1943. The six-wheeled bus was mainly produced for urban public transport users in major Italian cities like Rome and Milan. All in all, 185 examples were built. The Alfa Romeo 110AF trolley bus was developed from the 110A; around twice as many of the electrified models were built.

== Bodies ==
12 examples from Tallero
8 examples from Macchi
12 examples from Verasina
The bus had a double-decker version from Caproni from this version only 2 copies were made.

== Technical characteristics ==
The buses used an engine with 140 hp and came with two different wheelbases. The base length was 12 m (470 in) and engine capacity 12,517 cc. The 110 A has a 5,910 mm (232.7 in) wheelbase, while the 110 AC (Corto, "short") has a 5,010 mm (197.2 in) wheelbase. While most were diesels, Alfa Romeo also offered the 110 AG/ACG which ran on producer gas (33 examples built; most were converted back to diesel after the war), and the methane-powered 110 AM (13 examples built).

== Transport ==
Used in Milan from ATM.
Naples

== See also ==
- List of buses
