= Rolling bed dryer =

Rolling bed dryers are used for efficiently processing large amounts of material that need their respective moisture levels reduced. Rolling bed dryers are most often used for drying wood chips and organic residues and are most often utilized in the biomass, waste/recycling, wood particle board, pellet, and biofuel industries.

== General concept ==
The versatility of the rolling bed dryer is based on its simple idea of product circulation. The biomass processed through the rolling bed dryer can be not only efficiently dried but also has the option of being cleaned simultaneously. This provides for efficiency and conservation in energy which results in lower production costs. Biomass is being increasingly used as an alternative fuel source. Providing for this demands innovative solutions.

== Applications ==
- Wood chips
- Cropped biomass
- Alternative fuels
- Sugar beets pulp
- Bush reaping
- Greenery cut
- Trimmings
- Green waste

== Process ==
Large bulks of biomass is permanently circulated and mixed by highly effective paddles. This basic idea combines the flow of large bulks of product good heat transfer with continuous movement of the product for even drying results. The drying air is supplied through a perforated plate under the moving bulk of product. Depending on the amount of ventilation., it is possible to separate fine materials such as dust, fibers, and sand from the bulk material collecting this separately alongside the ongoing drying process. This simultaneous cleaning occurs through the use of the material against itself to remove, separate, and collect fine materials such as fibers, sand and dust from the drying bulk material. Having this occur at the same time as the drying process saves not only time and energy, but also maintains better the caloric value of the residual biomass and reduces ash content.

After the drying process is completed the dried output is suitable for direct firing and pelletizing/briquetting as well as for more demanding processes such as gasification or torrefaction of biomass.

=== See also ===
- Rotary dryer
- Fluidized bed
- Allgaier (company)
