= Industrial dryer =

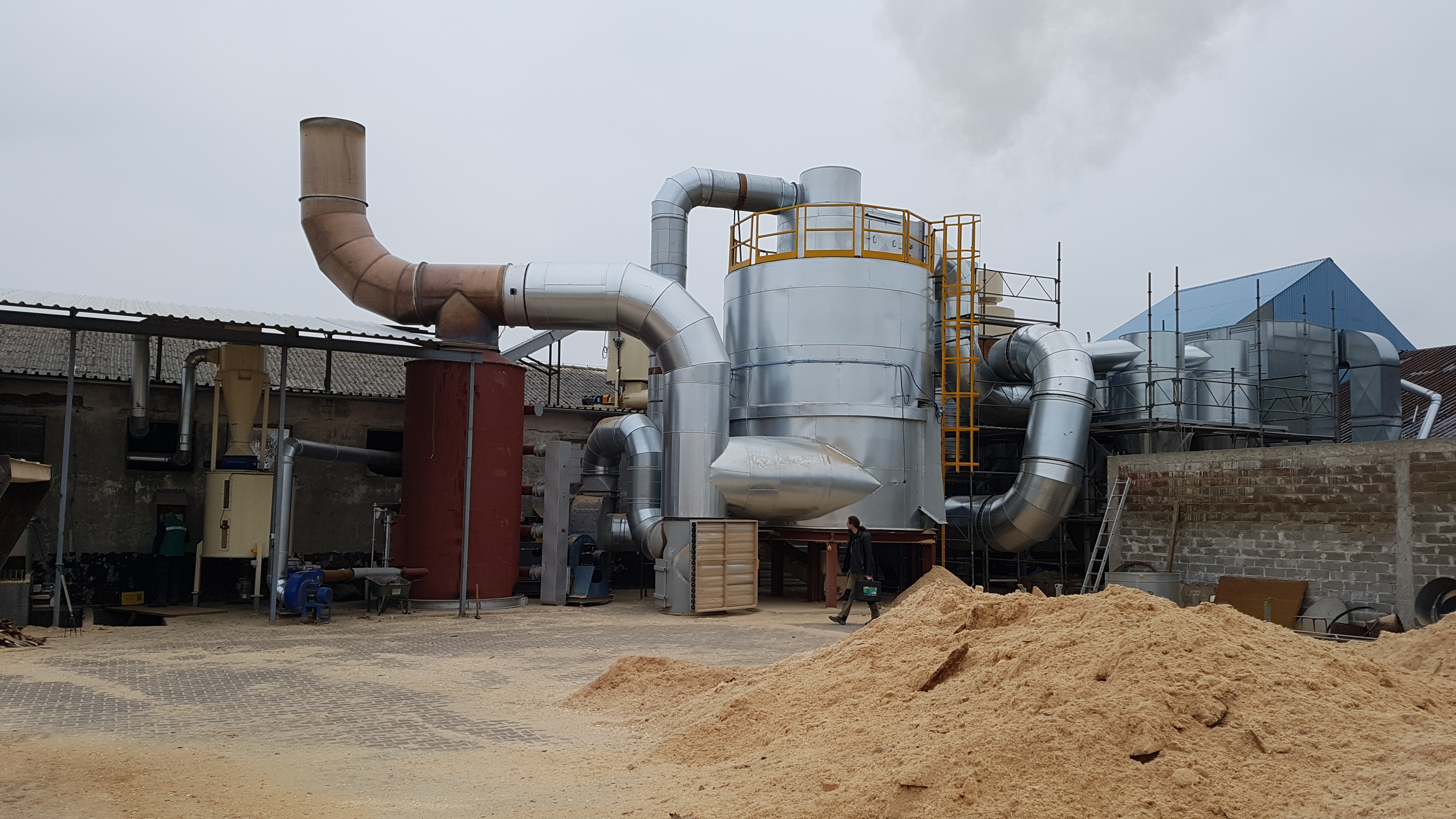
10 t/h TORBED Sawdust Dryer

Industrial dryers are used to efficiently process large quantities of bulk materials that need reduced moisture levels. Depending on the amount and the makeup of material needing to be dried, industrial dryers come in many different models constructed specifically for the type and quantity of material to be processed. The most common types of industrial dryers are fluidized bed dryers, rotary dryers, rolling bed dryers, conduction dryers, convection dryers, pharmaceutical dryers, suspension/paste dryers, toroidal bed or TORBED dryers and dispersion dryers. Various factors are considered in determining the correct type of dryer for any given application, including the material to be dried, drying process requirements, production requirements, final product quality requirements and available facility space.

== See also ==
- Fluidized bed
- Rotary dryer
- Rolling bed dryer
- Toroidal Bed or TORBED dryer
