= Flights (rotary dryer) =

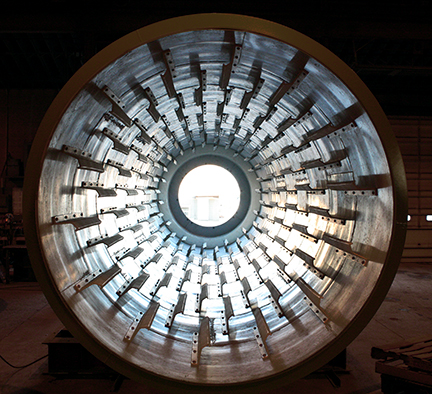
Rotary Dryer Flights

Flights, also commonly referred to as "material lifters" or "shovelling plates" are used in rotary dryers and rotary coolers to shower material through the process gas stream. Fixed to the interior of the rotary drum, these fin-like structures scoop material up from the material bed at the bottom of the drum and shower it through the gas stream as the drum rotates. This showering creates a curtain of material spanning the width of the drum, helping to maximize the efficiency of heat transfer.

Depending on the needs of the material and the process, a variety of flight designs and placement patterns are used in order to create a maximum efficiency curtain while still retaining the integrity of the product.
