= Wood gas =

Syngas fuel created by gasification of biomass

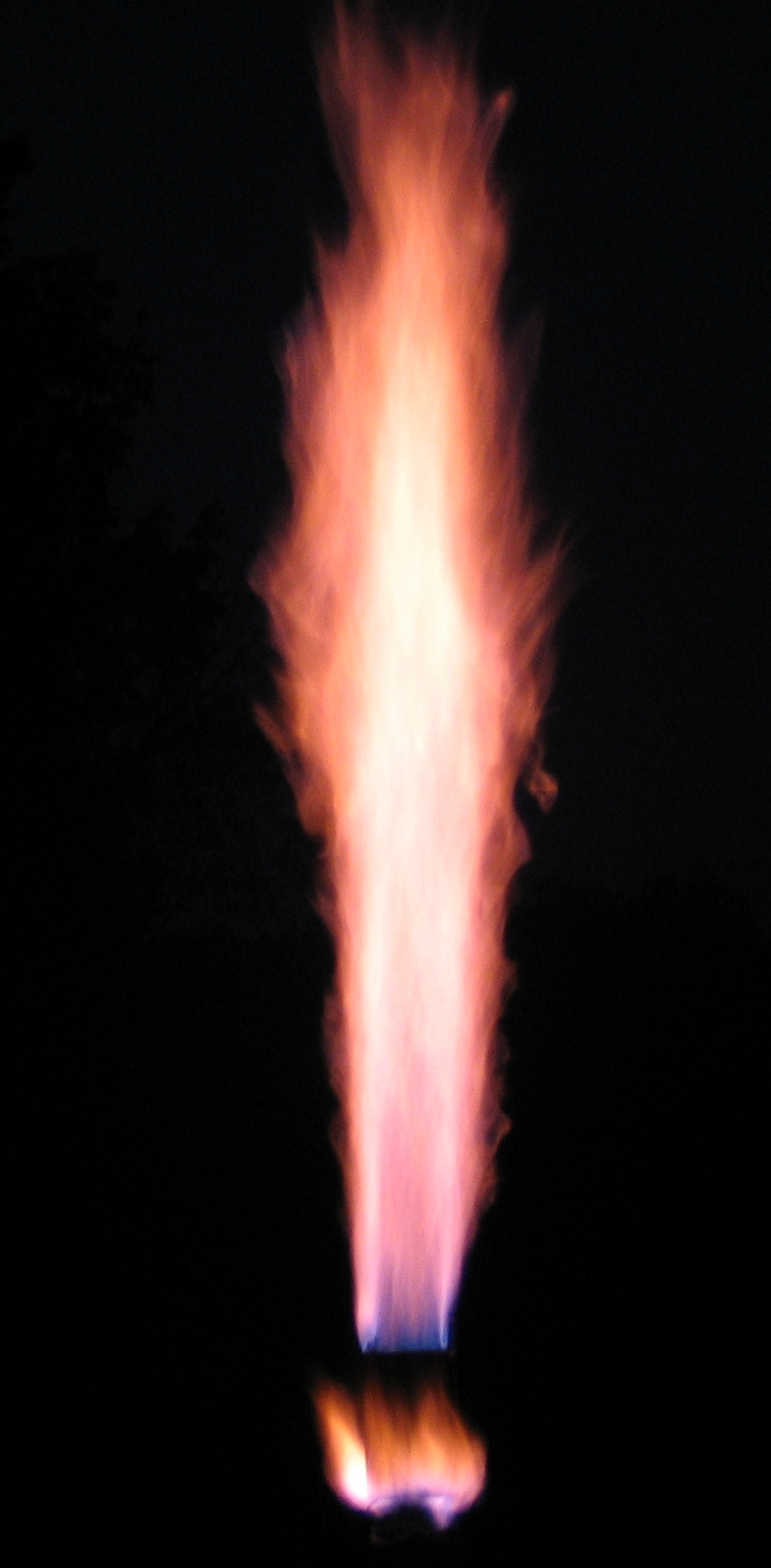
Flame from a wood gas generator

Wood gas is a fuel gas that can be used for furnaces, stoves, and vehicles. During the production process, biomass or related carbon-containing materials are gasified within the oxygen-limited environment of a wood gas generator to produce a combustible mixture. In some gasifiers this process is preceded by pyrolysis, where the biomass or coal is first converted to char, releasing methane and tar rich in polycyclic aromatic hydrocarbons.

In contrast with synthesis gas, which is almost pure mixture of hydrogen and carbon monoxide, wood gas also contains a variety of organic compounds ("distillates") that require scrubbing for use in other applications. Depending on the kind of biomass, a variety of contaminants are produced that will condense out as the gas cools. When producer gas is used to power cars and boats or distributed to remote locations it is necessary to scrub the gas to remove the materials that can condense and clog carburetors and gas lines.

== History ==
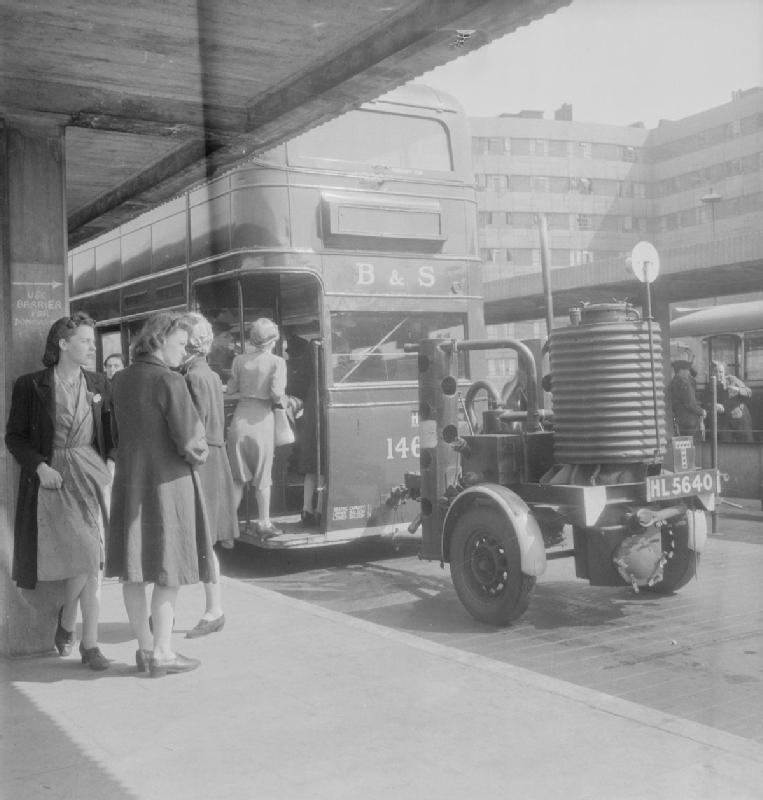
A bus, powered by wood gas generated by a gasifier on a trailer, Leeds, England, c. 1943

The first wood gasifier was apparently built by Gustav Bischof in 1839. In 1873, Thaddeus S. C. Lowe developed and patented the water gas process by which large amounts of hydrogen gas could be generated for residential and commercial use in heating and lighting. Unlike the common coal gas, or coke gas which was used in municipal service, this gas provided a more efficient heating fuel.

Gasification was an important and common technology during the 19th and early 20th century. Town gas produced from coal was widely used, mainly for lighting purposes. When stationary internal combustion engines based on the Otto cycle became available in the 1870s, they began displacing steam engines as prime movers in many works requiring stationary motive power. Adoption accelerated after the Otto engine's patent expired in 1886. The potential and practical applicability of gasification to internal combustion engines were well understood from the earliest days of their development.

=== Gasification to power a vehicle's internal combustion engine ===
The first vehicle powered by wood gas was built by T.H. Parker in 1901. Around 1900, many cities delivered fuel gases (centrally produced, typically from coal) to residences. Natural gas came into use only in the 1930s.

Wood gas vehicles were used during World War II as a consequence of the rationing of fossil fuels. In Germany alone, around 500,000 "producer gas" vehicles were in use at the end of the war. Trucks, buses, tractors, motorcycles, ships, and trains were equipped with a wood gasification unit. In 1942, when wood gas had not yet reached the height of its popularity, there were about 73,000 wood gas vehicles in Sweden, 65,000 in France, 10,000 in Denmark, and almost 8,000 in Switzerland. In 1944, Finland had 43,000 "woodmobiles", of which 30,000 were buses and trucks, 7,000 private vehicles, 4,000 tractors and 600 boats.

Wood gasifiers are still manufactured in China and Russia for automobiles and as power generators for industrial applications. Trucks retrofitted with wood gasifiers are used in North Korea in rural areas, particularly on the roads of the east coast.

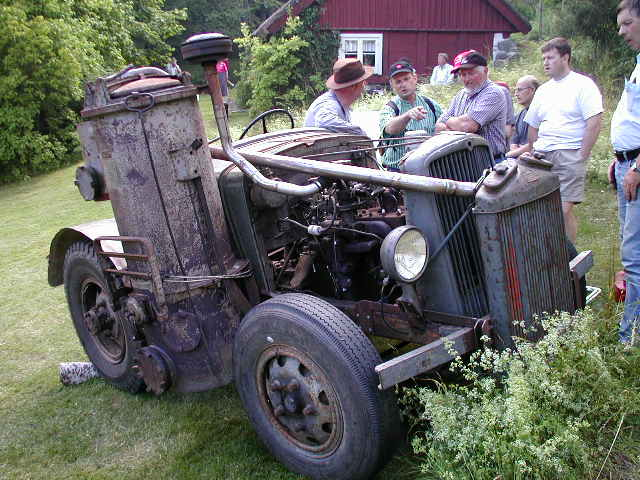
A wood gas generator fitted to a Ford truck converted into a tractor, Per Larsson Tractor Museum, Sweden, 2003

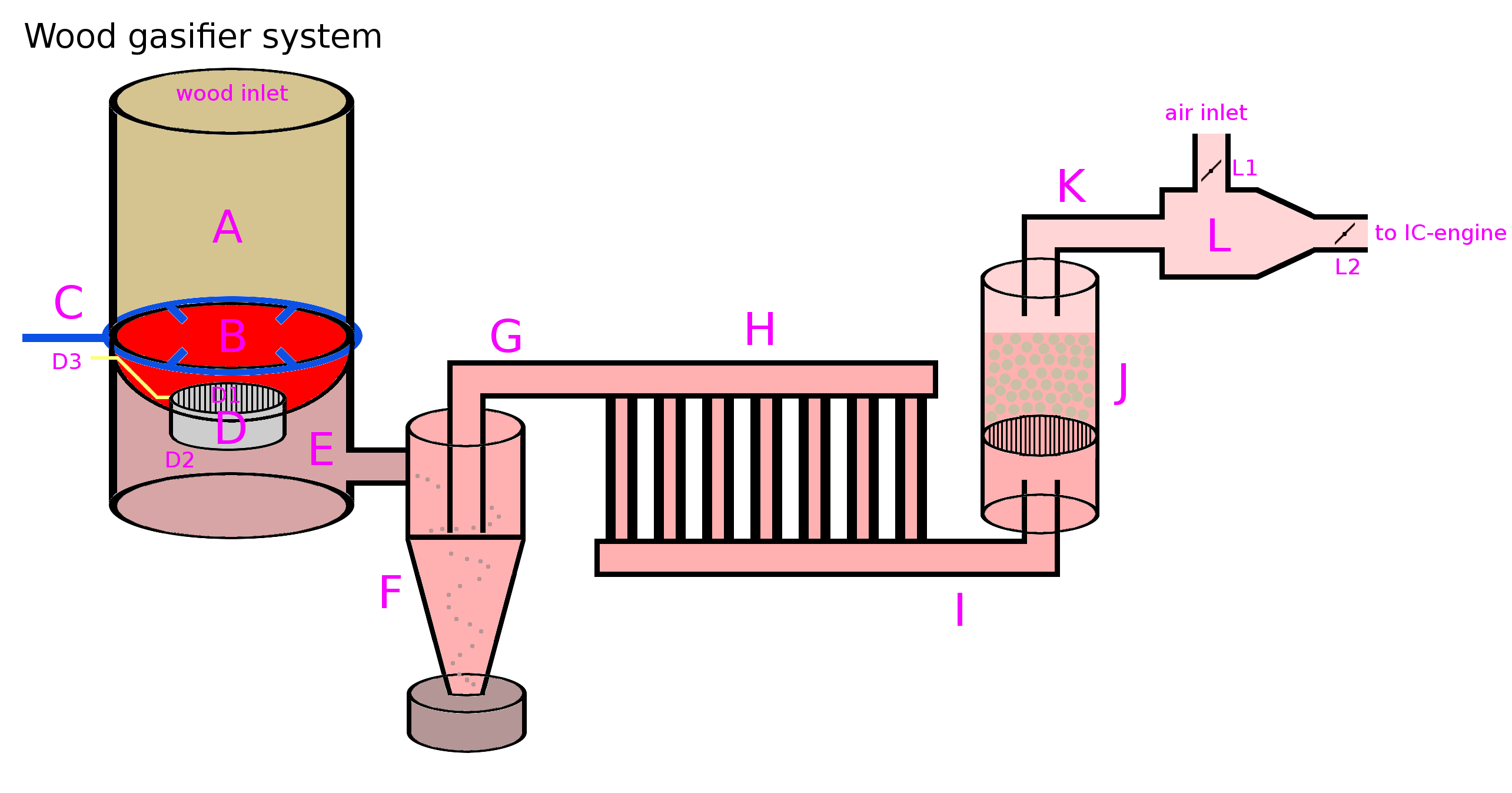
Wood gasifier system

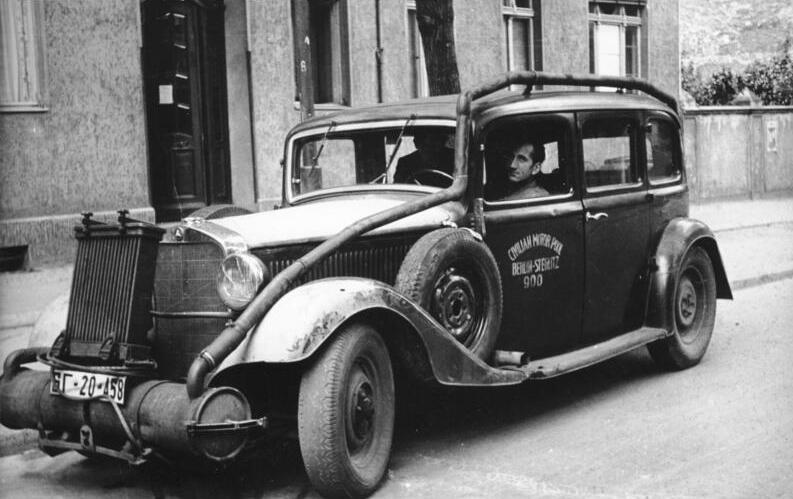
A wood-gas powered car, Berlin, 1946. Note the secondary radiator, required to cool the gas before it is introduced into the engine.

== Production ==
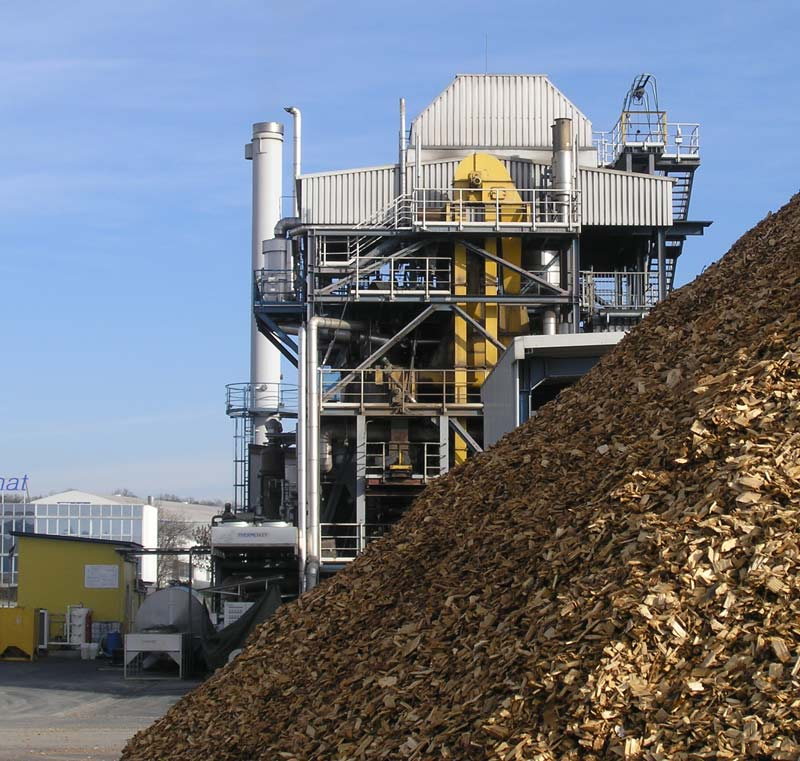
Fluidized bed gasifier in Güssing, Austria, operated on wood chips

A wood gasifier takes wood chips, sawdust, charcoal, coal, rubber or similar materials as fuel and burns these incompletely in a fire box, producing wood gas, solid ash and soot, the latter of which have to be removed periodically from the gasifier. The wood gas can then be filtered for tars and soot/ash particles, cooled and directed to an engine or fuel cell. Most of these engines have strict purity requirements of the wood gas, so the gas often has to pass through extensive gas cleaning in order to remove or convert, i.e., "crack", tars and particles. The removal of tar is often accomplished by using a water scrubber. Running wood gas in an unmodified gasoline-burning internal combustion engine may lead to problematic accumulation of unburned compounds.

The quality of the gas from different "gasifiers" varies a great deal. Staged gasifiers, where pyrolysis and gasification occur separately instead of in the same reaction zone as was the case in the World War II gasifiers, can be engineered to produce essentially tar-free gas (less than 1 mg/m^{3}), while single-reactor fluidized bed gasifiers may exceed 50,000 mg/m³ tar. The fluidized bed reactors have the advantage of being much more compact, with more capacity per unit volume and price. Depending on the intended use of the gas, tar can be beneficial, as well by increasing the heating value of the gas.

The heat of combustion of "producer gas" – a term used in the United States, meaning wood gas produced for use in a combustion engine – is rather low compared to other fuels. Taylor (1985) reports that producer gas has a lower heat of combustion of 5.7 MJ/kg versus 55.9 MJ/kg for natural gas and 44.1 MJ/kg for gasoline. The heat of combustion of wood is typically 15–18 MJ/kg. Presumably, these values can vary somewhat from sample to sample. The same source reports the following chemical composition by volume which most likely is also variable:

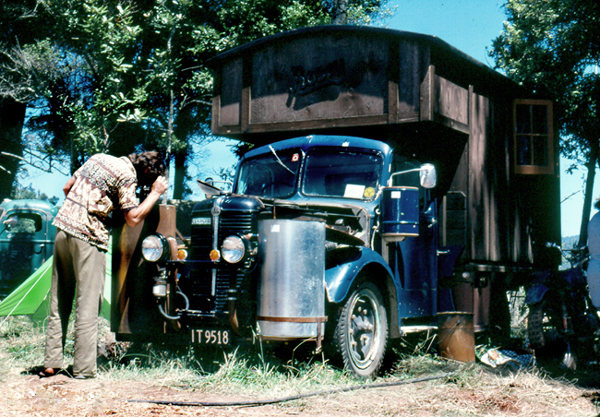
A charcoal gas producer at the Nambassa alternative festival in New Zealand in 1981

"Producer gas" composition
Chemical name	Formula	Fraction
Nitrogen	N_{2}	50.9%
Carbon monoxide	CO	27.0%
Hydrogen	H_{2}	14.0%
Carbon dioxide	CO_{2}	4.5%
Methane	CH_{4}	3.0%
Oxygen	O_{2}	0.6%

The composition of the gas is strongly dependent on the gasification process, the gasification medium (air, oxygen or steam), and the fuel moisture. Steam-gasification processes typically yield high hydrogen contents, downdraft fixed bed gasifiers yield high nitrogen concentrations and low tar loads, while updraft fixed bed gasifiers yield high tar loads.

During the production of charcoal for blackpowder, the volatile wood gas is vented. Extremely-high-surface-area carbon results, suitable for use as a fuel in black powder.

== See also ==
- Biogas
- Biochar – charcoal from biomass
- Gasification
- Gasification – outdoor wood boilers
- Producer gas
- Rocket stove
- Synthesis gas
- Water gas
- Pyrolysis
