= Fuel gas =

Fuels which under ordinary conditions, are gaseous

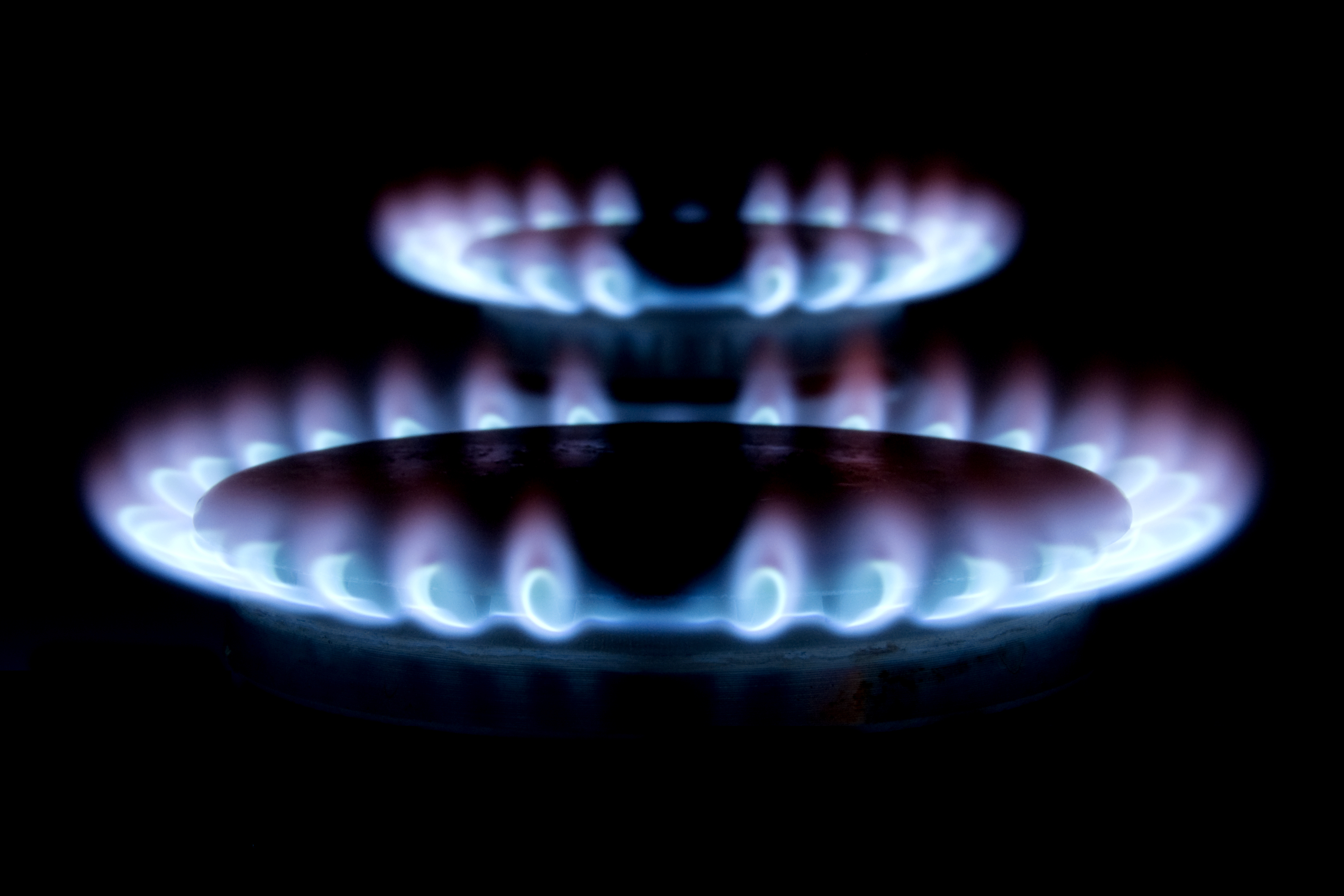
Blue flame of fuel gas burners

Fuel gas is one of a number of fuels that under ordinary conditions are gaseous. Most fuel gases are composed of hydrocarbons (such as methane and propane), hydrogen, carbon monoxide, or mixtures thereof. Such gases are sources of energy that can be readily transmitted and distributed through pipes.

Fuel gas is contrasted with liquid fuels and solid fuels, although some fuel gases are liquefied for storage or transport (for example, autogas and liquified petroleum gas). While their gaseous nature has advantages, avoiding the difficulty of transporting solid fuel and the dangers of spillage inherent in liquid fuels, it also has limitations. It is possible for a fuel gas to be undetected and cause a gas explosion. For this reason, odorizers are added to most fuel gases. Natural gas is one of the most widely used gaseous fuels, with applications in residential, commercial, industrial, and electricity-generation sectors

== Types of fuel gas ==
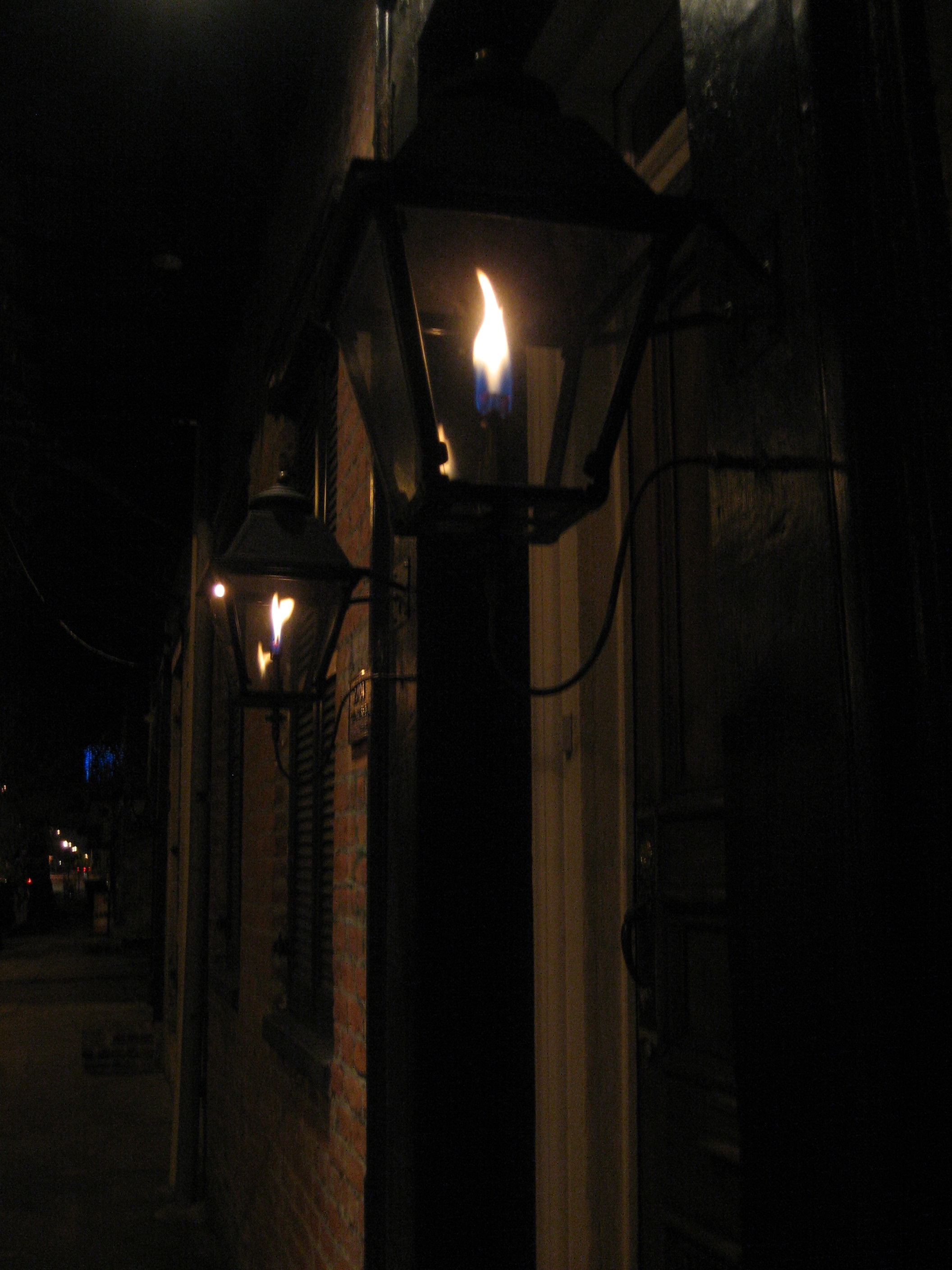
19th-century style gas lights in New Orleans

There are two broad classes of fuel gases, based not on their chemical composition, but their source and the way they are produced: those found naturally, and those manufactured from other materials.

=== Manufactured fuel gas ===
Manufactured fuel gases are those produced by chemical transformations of solids, liquids, or other gases. When obtained from solids, the conversion is referred to as gasification and the facility is known as a gasworks.

Manufactured fuel gases include:

- Coal gas, obtained from pyrolysis of coal
- Water gas, largely obsolete, obtained by passing steam over hot coke
- Producer gas, largely obsolete, obtained by passing steam and air over hot coke
- Syngas, major current technology, obtained mainly from natural gas
- Wood gas, obtained mainly from wood, once was popular and of relevance to biofuels
- Biogas, obtained from landfills
- Blast furnace gas
- Hydrogen from Electrolysis or Steam reforming

The coal gas made by the pyrolysis of coal contains impurities such a tar, ammonia and hydrogen sulfide. These must be removed and a substantial amount of plant may be required to do this.

=== Well or mine extracted fuel gases ===
In the 20th century, natural gas, composed primarily of methane, became the dominant source of fuel gas, as instead of having to be manufactured in various processes, it could be extracted from deposits in the earth. Natural gas may be combined with hydrogen to form a mixture known as hydrogen compressed natural gas, often written as HCNG.

Additional fuel gases obtained from natural gas or petroleum:

- Propane
- Butane
- Regasified liquefied petroleum gas

The composition of natural gas varies widely, but the table shows a typical composition.

Composition of natural gas
Component	Volume %
Methane	93.63
Ethane	3.25
Propane	0.69
Butane	0.27
Other hydrocarbons	0.20
Nitrogen	1.78
Carbon dioxide	0.13
Helium	0.05

Natural gas is produced with water and gas condensate. These liquids have to be removed before the gas can be used as fuel. Even after treatment the gas will be saturated and liable to condense as liquid in the pipework. This can be reduced by superheating the fuel gas.

== Specification ==
In addition to chemical composition fuel gas may need to comply with parameters such as calorific value, Wobbe index, dewpoint, etc. The following specification is for the British National Transmission System.

Specification of fuel gas
Content or characteristic	Value
Gross calorific value	37.0 – 44.5 MJ/m^{3}
Wobbe number*	47.2 – 51.41 MJ/m^{3}
Water dewpoint	<-10 °C @ 85barg
Hydrocarbon dewpoint	<-2 °C
Hydrogen sulphide content*	≤5 mg/m^{3}
Total sulphur content (including H_{2}S)*	≤50 mg/m^{3}
Hydrogen content*	≤0.1% (molar)
Oxygen content*	≤0.2% (molar)
Carbon dioxide content	≤2.0% (molar)
Nitrogen content	<5.0% (molar)
Total inerts	<7.0%
Incomplete combustion factor*	≤0.48
Soot index*	≤0.60

Incomplete Combustion Factor (ICF) – an empirical index that relates the composition of a gas to its tendency to burn incompletely in a gas appliance. Dutton defined the ICF as: ICF = 0.64 × (W − 50.73 + 0.03 × PN) where W is the Wobbe index, MJ/m^{3}; PN is the volumetric percentage of C_{3}H_{8} plus N_{2} in a three-component mixture.

Soot Index (SI) – an empirical index that relates the composition of a gas to its tendency to produce soot during combustion in a gas appliance.

The calorific value of manufactured gas is around 500 Btu per cubic foot (18,629 kJ/m^{3}). Whereas, the calorific value of natural gas is twice that at around 1000 Btu per cubic foot (37,259 kJ/m^{3}). For a given amount of heat only half the volume of natural gas is required.

== Uses of fuel gas ==
One of the earliest uses was gas lighting, which enabled the widespread adoption of streetlamps and the illumination of buildings in towns. Fuel gas was also used in gas burners, in particular the Bunsen burner used in laboratories. It may also be used gas heaters, camping stoves, and even to power vehicles, as they have a high calorific value.

Fuel gas is widely used by industrial, commercial and domestic users. Industry uses fuel gas for heating furnaces, kilns, boilers and ovens and for space heating and drying . The electricity industry uses fuel gas to power gas turbines to generate electricity. The specification of fuel gas for gas turbines may be quite stringent. Fuel gas may also be used as a feedstock for chemical processes.

Fuel gas in the commercial sector is used for heating, cooking, baking and drying, and in the domestic sector for heating and cooking.

Currently, fuel gases, especially syngas, are used heavily for the production of ammonia for fertilizers and for the preparation of many detergents and specialty chemicals.

On an industrial plant fuel gas may be used to purge pipework and vessels to prevent the ingress of air. Any fuel gas surplus to needs may be disposed of by burning in the plant gas flare system.

For users that burn gas directly fuel gas is supplied at a pressure of about 15 psi (1 barg). Gas turbines need a supply pressure of 250-350 psi (17-24 barg).
