= Wood gas generator =

Device that converts timber or charcoal into wood gas

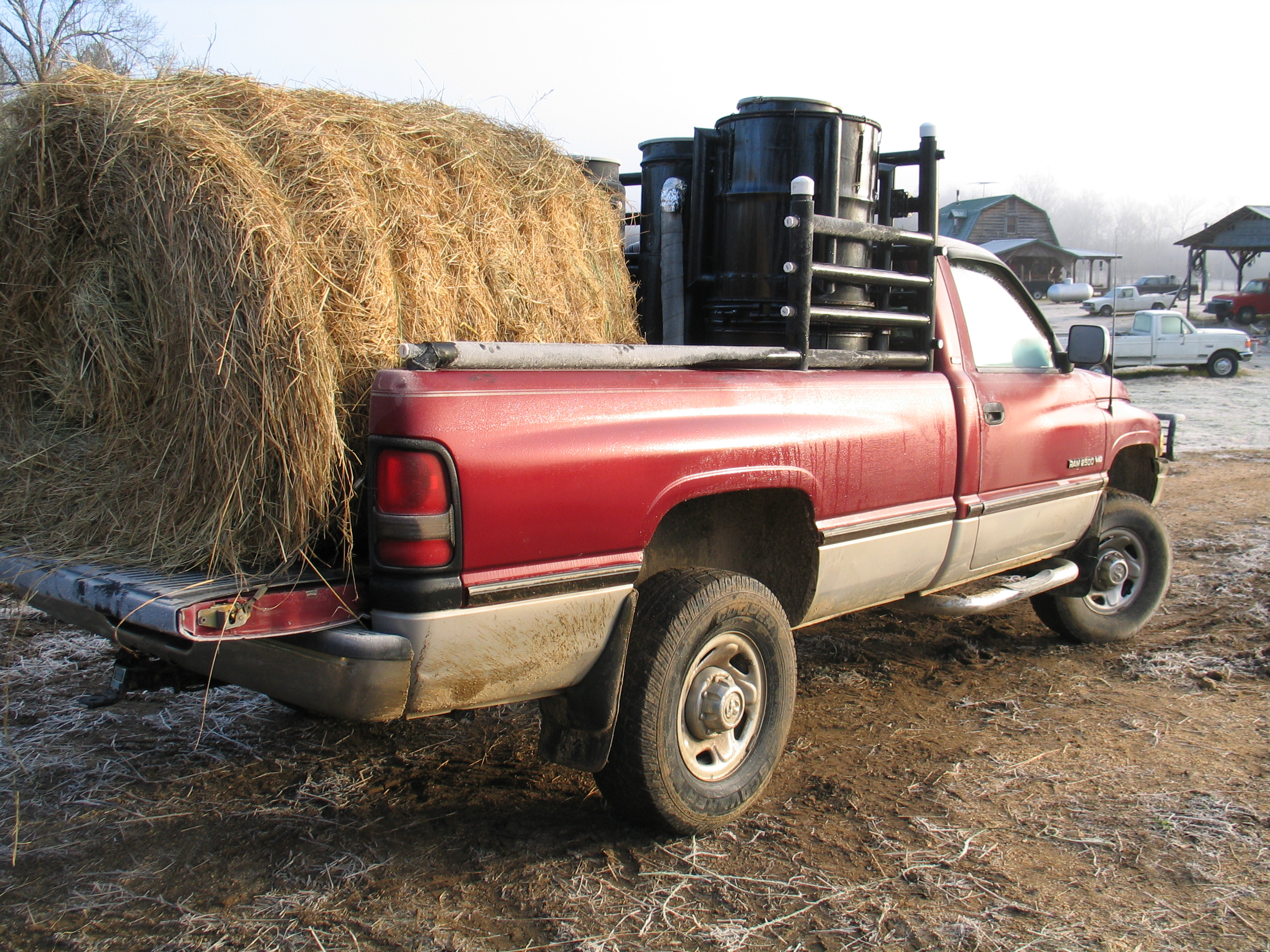
Dodge V10 hauling hay with woodgas. Keith gasifier system

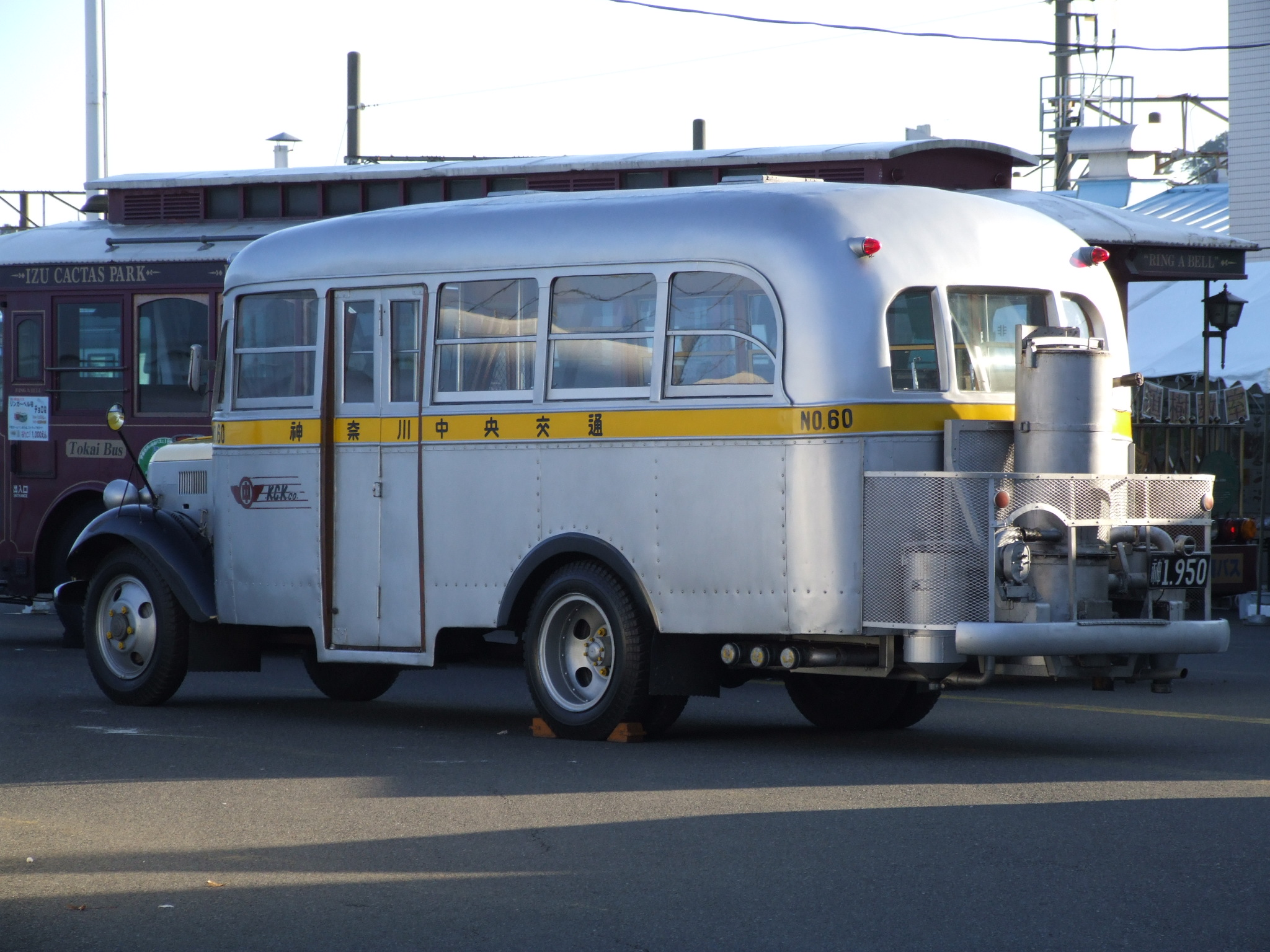
Santa-Go, Kanagawa Chuo Kotsu Co., Ltd.

A wood gas generator is a gasification unit which converts timber or charcoal into wood gas, a producer gas consisting of atmospheric nitrogen, carbon monoxide, hydrogen, traces of methane, and other gases, which – after cooling and filtering – can then be used to power an internal combustion engine or for other purposes. Historically wood gas generators were often mounted on vehicles, but present studies and developments concentrate mostly on stationary plants.

== History ==
During the late 19th century internal combustion engines were commonly fueled by town gas, and during the early 20th century many stationary engines switched to using producer gas created from coke which was substantially cheaper than town gas which was based on the distillation (pyrolysis) of more expensive coal.

- 1901: Thomas Hugh Parker builds the first known motor vehicle powered by wood gas.
- 1920s: French engineer Georges Imbert develops a more practical, compact wood gas generator (the Imbert generator) that could be more easily mounted on standard vehicles.

During World War II, gasoline was rationed and in short supply. Due to the lack of gasoline from petroleum, older people recalled how to build gasifiers for both wood and coal, and how to convert internal combustion engines to run on gaseous fuel, and wood gas generators were in active production. In Great Britain, France, the United States and Germany, large numbers of such generators were constructed or improvised to convert wood and coal into fuel for vehicles. Commercial generators were in production before and after the war for use in special circumstances or in distressed economies. Some World War II era wood gas generators were of the "Imbert" downdraft type, designed around 1920 by French inventor Georges Imbert.

Germany produced Gazogene units for vehicles including cars, trucks, artillery tractors and even tanks, to preserve the limited supplies of fuel. Even in non-combatant countries, such as Sweden, Brazil or Spain, gasogene was popular, as oil became hard to obtain. In Brazil, a racer named Chico Landi won at São Paulo's Interlagos circuit in 1944, driving a wood gas-powered Alfa Romeo.

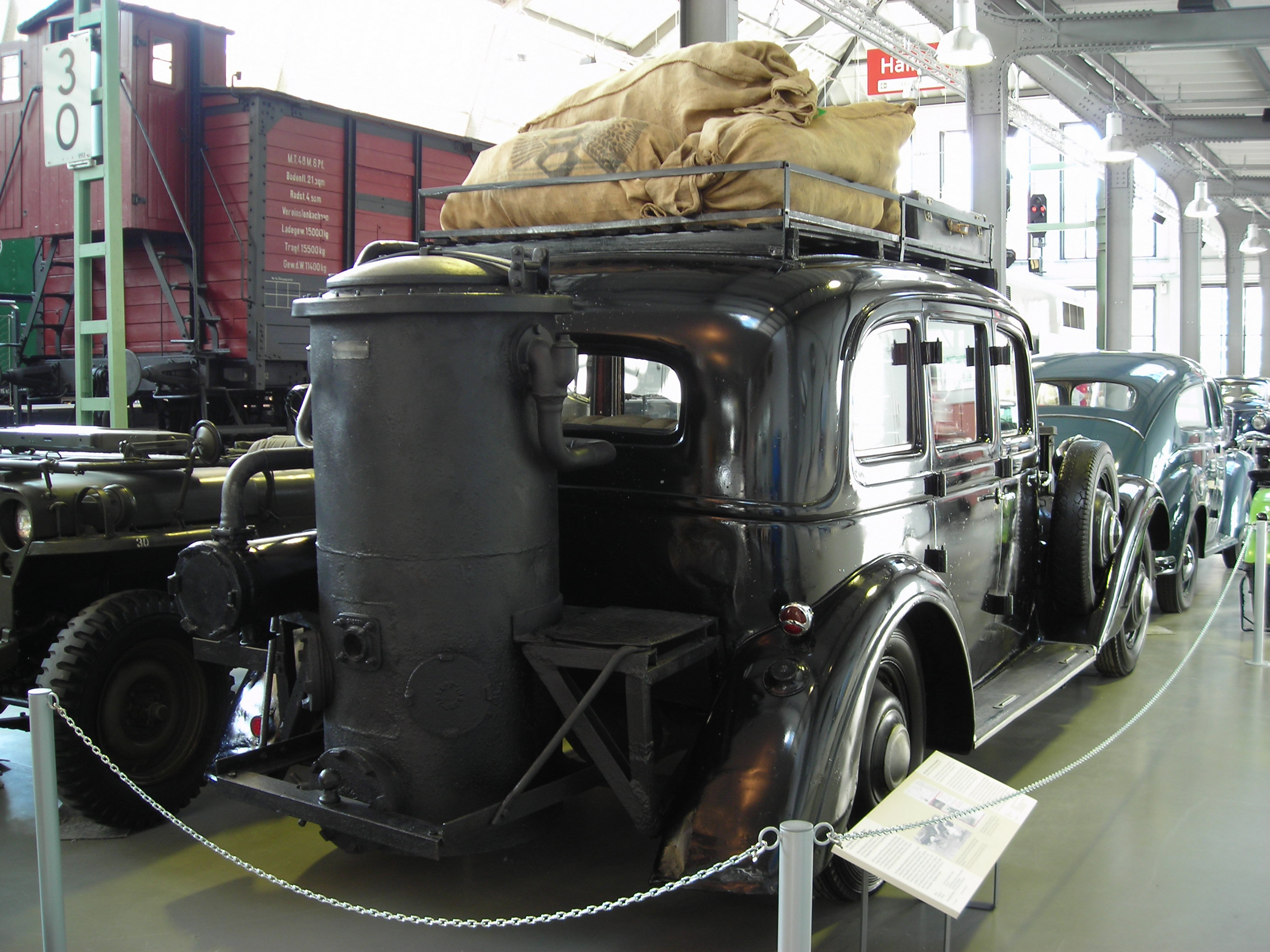
Adler Diplomat in WWII with wood gas generator

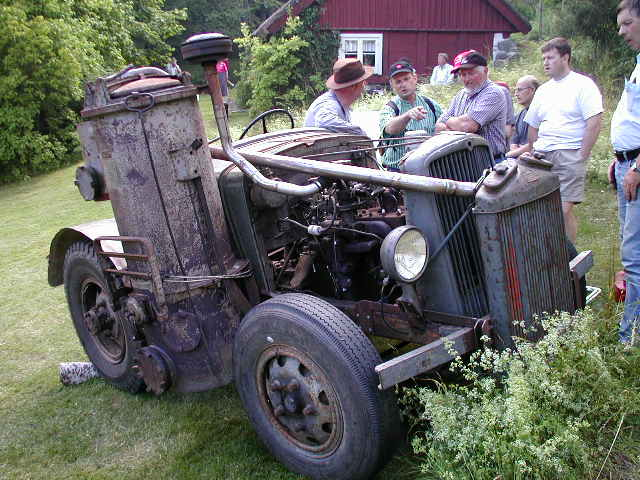
Imbert gasifier on a Ford truck converted to a tractor, Per Larssons Antique Tractor Museum, Sweden, 2003

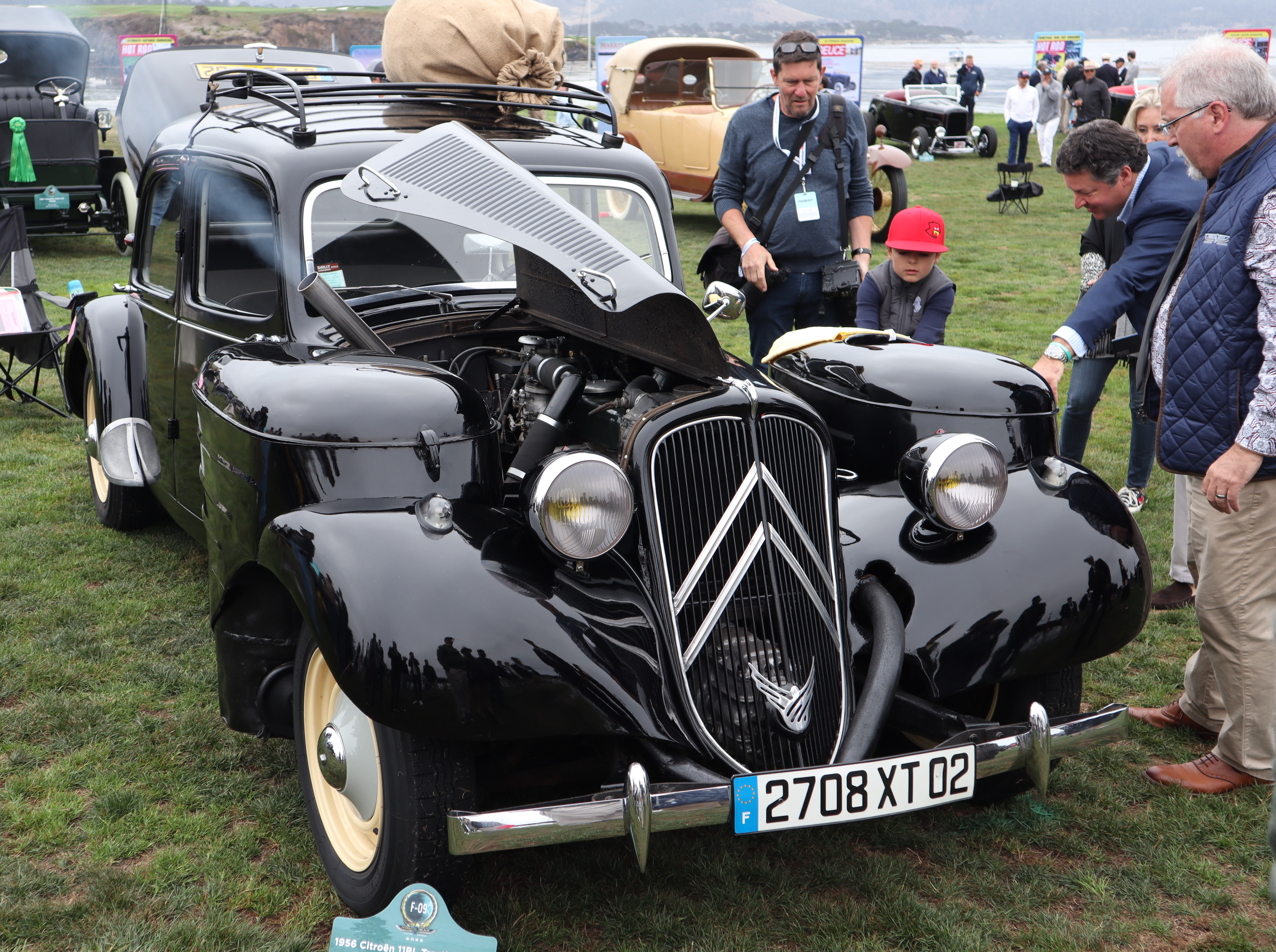
Demonstration of a working Gohin-Poulenc "gasogene" system in a 1956 Citroën Traction Avant

=== Post World War II ===
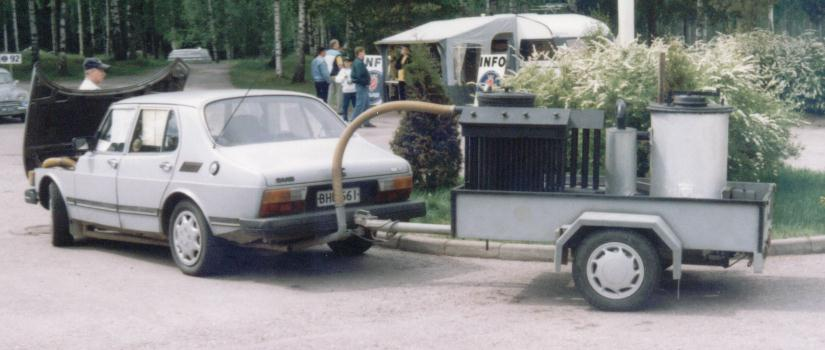
Saab 99 running on wood gas in Finland. The gas generator is on the trailer.

When oil prices rose there was renewed interest in wood gas generators. The US Federal Emergency Management Agency (FEMA) published a book in March 1989 describing how to build a gas generator in an emergency when oil was not available. It described a design called the "stratified downdraft gasifier" which solves several drawbacks of earlier types.

The European Union sponsored a wood gas project in Güssing, Austria, starting in 2005. This project was an electric power plant with a wood gas generator and a gas engine to convert the wood gas into 2 MW electric power and 4.5 MW heat. There was also an experimental device to use the Fischer–Tropsch process to convert wood gas to a diesel-like fuel. By October 2005, it was possible to convert 5 kg of wood into 1 litre of fuel.

The Democratic People's Republic of Korea (North Korea) is also known to have trucks that run off of wood gas generators. The trucks are common outside of Pyongyang and are in rural villages and smaller towns. These trucks are utilized due to sanctions placed on North Korea regarding imports of oil and gas.

== Design ==
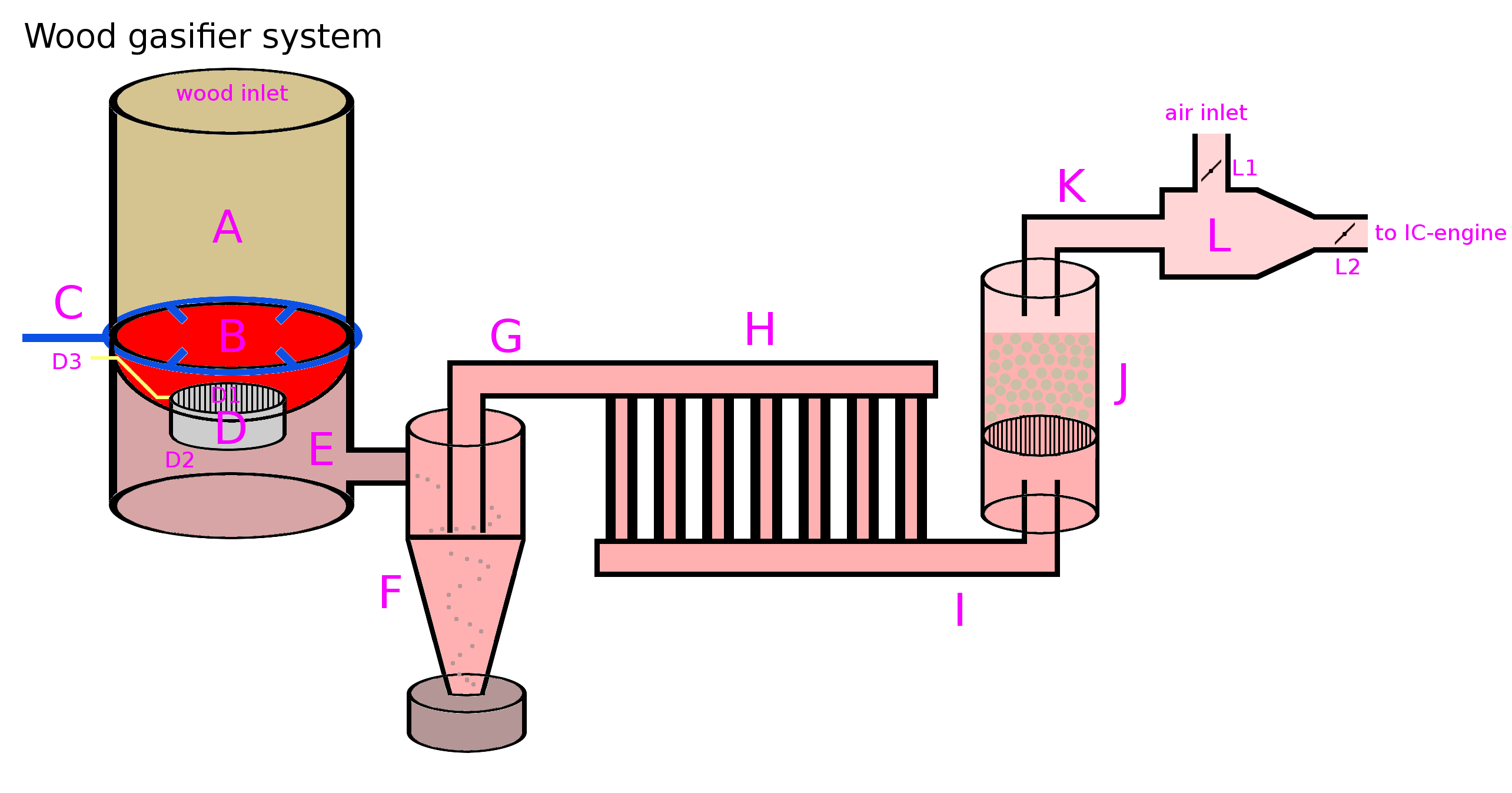
Diagram of a gas generator

There is a rich literature on gas-works, town-gas, gas-generation, wood-gas, and producer gas, that is now in the public domain due to its age.

Most successful wood gas generators in use in Europe and the United States are some variation of the earlier Imbert design. Wood gas generators often use wood; however, charcoal can also be used as a fuel. It is denser and produces a cleaner gas without the tarry volatiles and excessive water content of wood.

The FEMA wood gas generator is (by definition of the FEMA manual) an emergency gasifier. It is designed to be rapidly assembled in a true fuel crisis. This simplified design has distinct benefits over the earlier European units such as easier refueling and construction but is less popular than the earlier Imbert design because of significant new problems, which include a lack of a fixed oxidization zone and allows the oxidization zone to creep to a larger area, causing a drop in temperature; a lower operating temperature leads to tar production and it lacks a true reduction zone further increasing this design's propensity to produce tar. Tar in the wood gas stream is considered a dirty gas and tar will gum up a motor quickly, possibly leading to stuck valves and rings.

A new design known as the Keith gasifier improves on the FEMA unit, incorporating extensive heat recovery and eliminating the tar problem. Testing at Auburn University has shown it to be 37% more efficient than running gasoline. This system set the world speed record for biomass powered vehicles and has made several cross country tours.

The United Nations produced the FOA 72 document with details about their wood gas generator design and construction, as does World Bank technical paper 296.

=== Advantages ===
Wood gas generators have a number of advantages over use of petroleum fuels:

- They can be used to run internal combustion engines (or gas turbines, for maximal efficiency) or BHPPs using wood, a renewable resource, and in the absence of petroleum or natural gas, for example, during a fuel shortage.
- They have a closed carbon cycle, contribute less to global warming, and are sustainable in nature.
- They can be relatively easily fabricated in a crisis using materials on hand.
- They are far cleaner burning than a wood fire or a gasoline-powered engine (without emissions controls), producing little, if any soot.
- When used in a stationary design, they reach their true potential, as they are feasible to use in small combined heat and power scenarios (with heat recovery from the wood gas producer, and possibly the engine/generator, for example, to heat water for hydronic heating), even in industrialized countries, even during good economic times, provided that a sufficient supply of wood is attainable. Larger-scale installations can reap even better efficiencies, and are useful for district heating as well.

=== Disadvantages ===
The disadvantages of wood gas generators are:

- the large specific size
- the relatively slow starting speed; the time to heat the initially cold batch of wood to the necessary temperature level can take many minutes and in bigger plants even hours until the designed power is reached.
- a batch burning operation, that some designs feature, and that regularly interrupts the gas producing process.
- the stop operation out of a high load level is difficult (for example the stop of the engine using the gas): the residual heat still produces gas, which for a certain time leaves the gasifier either without control, or has to be used in a burner
- the primary combustible fuel-gas produced during gasification is carbon monoxide: it is an intentional fuel-product, and is subsequently burned to safe carbon dioxide in the engine (or other application) along with the other fuel-gases; however, continuous exposure to carbon monoxide can be fatal to humans even in small to moderate concentrations.
- the humidity of the wood (usually 15 to 20%) and the water vapor created by the O- and H-atoms of the dry wood itself (about 0.4 liters of water loaded with organic substances per kg of dry wood) condenses during the gas cooling and filtering procedure and yields a liquid (see also wood tar), which needs specific waste water treatment. This treatment requires about 25 to 35% of the created wood gas energy.

=== Safety consideration ===
When not carefully designed and used, there exists considerable potential for injury or death due to wood gas containing a large percentage of poisonous carbon monoxide (CO) gas. Wood gasifiers of proven design and thoroughly tested construction are considered safe to use outdoors, or in a partially enclosed space, for example, under a shelter open to the air on two sides; they may also be considered relatively safe to use in an extremely well ventilated (e.g. negative pressure) indoor area not connected to any indoor area used for sleeping, equipped with redundant (more than 1), completely independent, battery-powered, regularly tested carbon-monoxide gas detectors. However, prudence must dictate that any sort of experimental wood gasifier design or new construction be thoroughly tested outdoors, and only outdoors, with a "buddy" at all times, and with constant vigilance for any sign of headache, drowsiness, or nausea, as these are the first symptoms of carbon monoxide poisoning.

In addition, mixtures of excessive quantities of air and gas should be avoided as this could lead to the deflagration (explosion) of the gas in question if a combustion source is present. Long-term storage of wood-gas, except through the use of a gasholder-type water-displacement apparatus, should not be attempted, due to the volatile elements present in the gas, which, if allowed to excessively precipitate, will condense in the storage vessel. Under no circumstances should wood-gas ever be compressed to more than 1 bar (15 psi) above ambient, as this may induce condensation of volatiles, as well as lead to the likelihood of severe injury or death due to carbon monoxide or deflagration if the vessel leaks or fails.

== Media coverage ==
In 2008, an example of designing and constructing a working wood gas generator powered truck was shown on the National Geographic Channel's Planet Mechanics in the eighth episode, "Tree Powered Car".

In 2009, another example of designing and constructing a working wood gas powered generator engine was in the TV series The Colony in the second episode of the first season "Power Struggle". Also used in the tenth episode "Exodus" to power an escape vehicle.

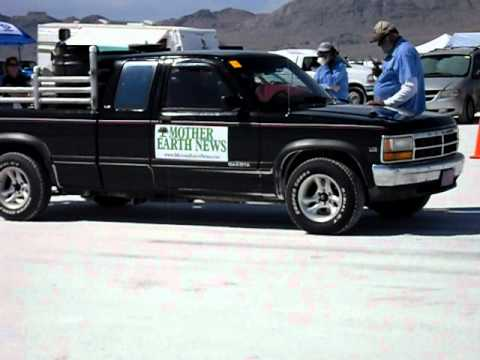
This truck set the land speed record for biomass powered vehicles in September 2011

A 2010, Mother Earth News article discussed and showed pictures of a wood gas powered engine installed in a pickup truck. As part of the BBC science series "Bang Goes The Theory", a Volkswagen Scirocco was converted to a design by Martin Bacon to run on used coffee grounds, and after its build in 2010 was driven solely on coffee from London to Manchester successfully. Part of the team are now working on a more advanced design leaning towards top speed as opposed to range.

On September 14, 2011, at the Bonneville Salt Flats a truck modified with a wood gas powered engine set a new world speed record for vehicles powered by wood gas with a speed of 73 mph.

On the popular US radio program Car Talk, a caller in episode 1201 (which aired on January 7, 2012, and was subsequently named "20 Miles Per Woodchip"), described a wood gas generating vehicle he rode in as a boy during World War II in Germany. The hosts were not familiar with the technology, likely because it was never widely adopted in the US.

On March 12, 2012, on a season 2 episode of Doomsday Preppers, a wood gas generator is shown running a Ford truck and a house electric generator by prepper Scott Hunt on his multi-acre woodland property in South Carolina.

Serbian TV sitcom "Truckdrivers 2" (="Kamiondzije II") from 1983. talks, as a part of plot, about a gas generator affixed to a chassis of a lorry.

An article appeared in Mother Earth News in April 2012 featuring the Keith gasifier, showing pictures and talking with inventor Wayne Keith.

In the BBC documentary Wartime Farm, Episode 5 (aired October 2012) they built a coal gas powered ambulance according to the specifications of a 1943 gas powered vehicle.

In Season 3 Of Mountain Men On The History Channel, Eustice Conway is shown operating a wood gasified Toyota pickup for hauling goods

The Finnish prime minister Juha Sipilä has received some media attention also for the wood gas powered car he built as a hobby prior to his political career. The "El Kamina", model year 1987 Chevrolet El Camino, is the fastest wood-gas powered car, 140 km/h, 87 mph.

== List of commercially available systems ==
There are only a few companies that produce wood gasifier systems commercially. A list can be found here below. Since wood gas systems have the tendency of being rather large, most focus on stationary applications (electricity production). Some may be suitable for building into vehicles though.

- Ankur Scientific Energy Technologies
- GASEK
- Holzenergie Wegscheid GmbH
- Vulcan Gasifier LLC
- Victory Gasworks
- Garringer Gasifier
- ALL Power Labs
- Husk Power Systems
- STAK Properties LLC
- Foutch Manufacturing
- Gasógenos GADA
- REP Renewable Energy Products GmbH
- Gasification Australia Pty Ltd
- International Supply Biz
- Borealis Wood Power Corp
- Zhengzhou Shuliy Machinery Co., Ltd
- Volter
- Burkhardt GmbH
- Spanner Re² GmbH
- MRC Green
- Associated Engineering Works
- National innovation Foundation – India,
- Trillion Gasifiers
- Northern Self Reliance
- Superior Gasification
- Creeco (Pvt) Ltd., Pakistan
- Tactical Wood Gas Inc
- SynCraft Engineering GmbH

== See also ==
- Engine-generator; can be connected to the gasifier on a wood gas car via a wood gas hose, hereby also being able to produce power when the vehicle's engine isn't running, in effect forming a vehicle-to-grid system
- Exhaust heat exchanger: can be used to help heat the wood gasifier, increasing gas output of the wood gasifier
- Hot air engine: similarly to the stirling engine, can use heat directly and can run on wood
- Stirling engine: another engine that can use heat from wood, rather than needing to convert it to wood gas first
- Xe than
