= Water gas =

Mixture of carbon monoxide and hydrogen

Water gas is a kind of fuel gas, a mixture of carbon monoxide and hydrogen. It is produced by "alternately hot blowing a fuel layer [coke] with air and gasifying it with steam". The caloric yield of the fuel produced by this method is about 10% of the yield from a modern syngas plant. The coke needed to produce water gas also costs significantly more than the precursors for syngas (mainly methane from natural gas), making water gas technology an even less attractive business proposition.

== Production ==
Synthesis gas is made by passing steam over a red-hot carbon fuel such as coke:

H_{2}O + C → H_{2} + CO (ΔH = +131 kJ/mol)

The reaction is endothermic, so the fuel must be continually re-heated to maintain the reaction. To do this, an air stream, which alternates with the vapor stream, is introduced to combust some of the carbon:

O_{2} + C → CO_{2} (ΔH = −393 kJ/mol)

Theoretically, to make 6 L of water gas, 5 L of air is required. Alternatively, to prevent contamination with nitrogen, energy can be provided by using pure oxygen to burn carbon into carbon monoxide.

O_{2} + 2 C → 2 CO (ΔH = −221 kJ/mol)

In this case, 1 L of oxygen will create 5.3 L of pure water gas.

== History ==
The water-gas shift reaction was discovered by Italian physicist Felice Fontana in 1780. Water gas was made in England from 1828 by blowing steam through white-hot coke.

=== Hydrocarbonate (gas) ===
Hydrocarbonate is an archaic term for water gas composed of carbon monoxide and hydrogen generated by passing steam through glowing coke. Hydrocarbonate was classified as a factitious air and explored for therapeutic properties by some eighteenth-century physicians, including Thomas Beddoes and James Watt. The term hydrocarbonate, coined by Beddoes in 1794, should not be confused with the modern name "hydrogen carbonate" for bicarbonate ion.

Between 1794 and 1802, physicians such as Tiberius Cavallo and Davies Gilbert experimented with hydrocarbonate as an analgesic and anesthetic. Humphry Davy infamously inhaled three quarts of hydrocarbonate at the Pneumatic Institution and nearly died upon "sinking into annihilation"; Davy recovered two days later and concluded inhalation of more hydrocarbonate could have "destroyed life immediately without producing any painful sensations". He was right: carbon monoxide poisoning can be fatal.

Diseases treated by hydrocarbonate included: tuberculosis, inflammation, asthma, expectoration, hemoptysis, pneumonia, hydrothorax, spasm and other indications. Many of the diseases treated with hydrocarbonate, whose active ingredient was carbon monoxide, are now being investigated using modern biomedical research methods to determine the therapeutic potential of carbon monoxide. For example, James Lind recognized hydrocarbonate to effectively treat lung inflammation; delivery of carbon monoxide via inhalation protocol or carbon monoxide-releasing molecules has significant preclinical data indicating an effective treatment for inflammation. The pioneering work of exploratory medicinal application of hydrocarbonate is an important origin for modern drug development.

James Watt suggested hydrocarbonate could act as "an antidote to the oxygen in blood" in 1794 and cautioned about the toxicity of an overdose prior to the discoveries of carbon monoxide (1800) and hemoglobin (1840). Despite Watt's observation, it is widely accepted that Claude Bernard had first described the mechanism for carbon monoxide poisoning by describing carbon monoxide's affinity for hemoglobin displacing oxygen to induce asphyxia circa 1857.

=== Lowe's gas process ===
In 1873, Thaddeus S. C. Lowe developed and patented the water gas process by which large amounts of hydrogen gas could be generated for residential and commercial use in heating and lighting. This gas provided a more efficient heating fuel than the common coal gas, or coke gas, which was used in municipal service. The process used the water-gas shift reaction:

CO + H_{2}O → CO_{2} + H_{2}

The process was discovered by passing high-pressure steam over hot coal, the major source of coke gas. Lowe's process improved upon the chimney systems by which the coal could remain superheated, thereby maintaining a consistently high supply of the gas. The reaction produced carbon dioxide and hydrogen, which, after a process of cooling and "scrubbing", produced hydrogen gas.

The process spurred on the industry of gas manufacturing, and gasification plants were established quickly along the eastern seaboard of the United States. Similar processes, like the Haber–Bosch process, led to the manufacture of ammonia (NH_{3}) by the combining of nitrogen, found in air, with hydrogen. This spurred on the refrigeration industry, which long used ammonia as its refrigerant. Lowe also held several patents on artificial ice making machines and was able to run successful businesses in cold storage, as well as products which operated on hydrogen gas.

== Variations ==
=== Carburetted water gas ===
Water gas has a lower heat of combustion than coal gas, so the calorific value was often boosted by passing the gas through a heated retort, into which oil was sprayed. The resulting mixed gas was called carburetted water gas. The average composition of carburetted water gas is as follows: 34–38% H_{2}; 23–28% CO; 17–21% saturated hydrocarbons; 13–16% unsaturated hydrocarbons; 0.2–2.2% CO_{2}; 2.5–5.0% N_{2}. It is used as a source of heat, since it has a high calorific value.

=== Semi-water gas ===
Semi-water gas is a synergy of the production processes for "Blue" water gas and an exothermic reaction lean gas—producer gas (gaz pauvre).

In the Semi-water gas process, a mixture of air and steam is continuously blown through the fuel bed. The heat generated by the exothermic reaction (Producer Gas) is immediately consumed by the endothermic reaction (Water Gas), allowing the entire process to run continuously at a stable temperature without the need for alternating "blow" and "make" cycles.

	Producer Gas (Generatorgas)	Semi-Water Gas (Dowson Gas/Halbwassergas)
Input	Air	Air + Steam
Reaction Type	Exothermic	Thermally balanced
Combustibles	CO (approx. 33%)	CO + H_{2} (max. 50%)

- Semi-Water Gas is a Diluted Water Gas: It is cheaper and easier to make continuously but is much weaker as a fuel.
- Doppelgas is an Enriched Water Gas: It is more complex to manufacture (requiring a Strache or Tully generator) but produces a high-quality gas suitable for municipal "Town Gas" distribution, whereas Semi-Water Gas was primarily used for industrial furnaces. While Strache perfected the process for German industry (specifically for treating bituminous and brown coal), a similar process known as the Tully Process had been implemented in England several years earlier.

	Semi-Water Gas (Halbwassergas)	Double Gas (Doppelgas / Strache Process)
Composition	A mixture of Water Gas + Producer Gas.	A mixture of Water Gas + Coal Gas (Schwelgas=Schwelen@400–700°C).
Manufacturing	Continuous: Air and steam are blown simultaneously through the fuel bed.	Intermittent: Alternating cycles of "Blow" (air only) and "Make" (steam only).
The "Rich" Element	None. It is a dilution of water gas.	"High-value" hydrocarbons.
Nitrogen Content	High	Very Low
Heating Value	Low (Lean Gas): Diluted by nitrogen. Approx. 1,500–1,800 kcal/m³.	High (Rich Gas): Enriched by coal volatiles. Approx. 3,300–3,500 kcal/m³.

While Doppelgas (Double Gas) is a two-stage mixture, Trigas (Triple Gas) is a three-stage integration designed to handle even "difficult" fuels like brown coal (lignite) more efficiently.

1. Structural Difference

- Doppelgas: Uses a built-in retort (an internal vessel) at the top of the generator to separate the coal distillation from the coke gasification.
- Trigas: Eliminates the internal retort. Instead, it uses a single, very high shaft furnace (hohen Schachtofen) divided into distinct zones.

2. The name Trigas reflects the fact that the final product is a blend of three distinct gas-making stages occurring simultaneously in the high shaft:

- Water Gas: Produced in the bottom zone by passing steam through incandescent coke/char.
- Schwelgas (Distillation Gas): Produced in the middle/upper zone as the rising hot water gas transfers its heat to the descending fresh coal, driving off volatile hydrocarbons.
- Producer Gas (Partial): Unlike the Strache process, which strictly separates the "Blow" and "Make" cycles to keep nitrogen out, the Trigas process was often optimized to allow a controlled amount of air/steam mixture to create a more continuous flow, sometimes resulting in a "Triple" blend of Water Gas, Distillation Gas, and a small, controlled amount of Producer Gas.

Feature	Doppelgas (Strache)	Trigas (Dellwik-Fleischer)
Apparatus	Generator with an internal retort.	High Shaft furnace (no internal retort).
Coal Type	Best for Bituminous Coal (Steinkohle).	Optimized for Brown Coal (Braunkohle) and Lignite.
Heat Transfer	Indirect (through the retort walls) + Direct.	Direct contact between rising gas and descending fuel.
By-products	High quality Tar and Ammonia recovery.	Focused on maximum gas yield; tar recovery is secondary.
Process Goal	A high-BTU "Town Gas" equivalent.	A versatile "Power Gas" (Kraftgas) for large industrial engines.

==== Distillation Gas ====
The term Schwelgas is most accurately translated into English as Low-temperature carbonization gas, also seen as:

- Carbonisation gas (Common in British engineering texts). [de:Schwelerei (Kohle) - Smoldering plant/works (Coal), "The goal was not the production of semi-coke … but rather the production of primary tar (Urteer), which could be processed into marine diesel oil and other fuels."] By utilizing complete gasification (restlose Vergasung), German industry converted low-grade lignite (brown coal) into high-calorific Double Gas for municipal and industrial power, while simultaneously extracting primary tar (Urteer) as a strategic feedstock for naval diesel fuels.
- Distillation gas (Referring to the process of driving off volatiles).
- Smoldering gas (A literal translation of the German root schwelen). de:Schwelen combustion without a flame, Schwelerei is the industrial process.
- Pyrolysis gas (The broader modern scientific term that also covers high-temperature derived gases). de:Pyrolysegas, "„Langsamen Pyrolyse“ bei Temperaturen zwischen 150 und 600 °C"

German Term	Technical Translation	Role in the Double Gas Process
Schwelung	Low-temperature carbonization	The process of heating coal at 450–700°C.
Schwelgas	Low-temperature carbonization gas	The "rich" gas used to enrich the mixture.
Schwelkoks	Semi-coke (or Char) (Note: Complete Gasification leaving only mineral ash. This was the most technologically advanced method, used in the Strache and Lurgi systems. The semi-coke was never allowed to cool or leave the machine.: 1. As the coal was "degassed" in the upper retort, the resulting semi-coke descended directly into the lower generator zone.; 2. It was blasted with steam (and sometimes oxygen) to trigger the water-gas reaction: C+H_{2}O⟶CO+H_{2}; 3. The solid semi-coke was entirely "extinguished" into water gas, leaving only mineral ash.; Water Gas from Vergasung of Semi-coke composed ~80–90% of the Doppelgas. Providing the Volume to carry/dilute the Schwelgas.; Schwelgas from Schwelung of Coal composed ~10–20% of the Doppelgas. Providing the Calorific Value and Illuminants.; For the semi-coke that was not immediately gasified (eventually becoming Doppelgas) or diverted and burned for power generation, Germany developed a "smokeless fuel" market similar to the British Coalite.)	The intermediate fuel used to make water gas.
Schwelteer	Low-temperature tar	A valuable byproduct often recovered before mixing.

In the context of Doppelgas (Double Gas) or Trigas processes, "Low-temperature carbonization gas" is the preferred term because it specifies that the gas was produced at temperatures between 450°C and 700°C. This distinguishes it from "Coal Gas," which is produced at high temperatures (above 1000°C) and has a different chemical profile.

German engineers like Strache used the specific word Schwelgas. It contains heavy hydrocarbons that provide a high heating value. Simply translating it as "Coal Gas," loses the distinction that this was a "richer" gas used specifically to "carburet" (enrich) the leaner Water Gas.

=== Water gas shift reaction ===
Pure hydrogen can be obtained from water gas by using the water–gas shift reaction, after subsequent removal of the carbon dioxide formed when carbon monoxide reacts with water.

== Uses ==
Although completely displaced by syngas, water gas could be applied to certain fuel cells. It is used in the Fischer–Tropsch process. It reacts with producer gas to produce fuel gas. It could also be used to gain pure hydrogen for synthesis of ammonia.

== See also ==
- Fluidized bed
- Fluidized bed combustion
- Gasification
- Linde–Frank–Caro process
- List of solid waste treatment technologies
- Plasma gasification
- Producer gas
- Pyrolysis
- Renewable natural gas
- Wood gas

== Bibliography ==
- Guillaume Delcourt, Notice sur le gaz à l'eau, 1894.
