= Ze-gen =

Converting waste into synthesis gas since 2004

Ze-gen, Inc.
- Company type: Private
- Industry: Waste-to-Energy; Gasification
- Founded: 2004
- Founder: William Davis
- Defunct: apparently around 2014
- Headquarters: Boston, Massachusetts, USA
- Key people: Walt Howard (CEO); Mark Prendergast (CFO)
- Number of employees: 28 (2009)
- Website: www.ze-gen.com

Ze-gen, Inc. was a renewable energy company developing advanced gasification technology to convert waste into synthesis gas. Founded in 2004, Ze-gen was a venture-backed company based in Boston, Massachusetts.

The company aimed to develop innovative technological solutions to reduce landfills and find beneficial use for waste material by converting waste to energy and nutrients, using advanced gasification.

Today Ze-gen appears to be defunct, and the company website was taken down in 2014.

== Technology ==
The liquid metal gasification process begins with feed material entering the gasifier through a gas-tight airlock into a refractory-lined vessel containing liquid copper, which is held at about 2200 °F. Material entering into the liquid metal gasifier undergoes a series of thermo-chemical reactions, which are auto-thermal under stable operating conditions. Initially, pyrolysis occurs and volatiles are driven into the headspace of the gasifier. In the subsequent gasification reaction, hydrogen (H_{2}) and carbon monoxide (CO) are favored as final products, along with carbon dioxide (CO_{2}) and a small amount of methane (CH_{4}). This product gas is called synthesis gas, also known as syngas.

The inorganic constituents, which are generally lighter than liquid metal, form a slag layer on top of the liquid metal bath and are removed as a vitrified non-leachable slag byproduct. The slag is either recycled or disposed of as an industrial by-product. While some metals and oxides present in the feedstock accumulate in the liquid metal bath, others will exit as vapor and are captured in the gas cleanup process.

The syngas produced can be used for several different end-use applications including: steam generation, electricity production, making industrial hydrogen gas, as chemical building blocks for synthetic diesel or ethanol, synthetic natural gas, methanol, or as a chemical feedstock into a variety of industrial processes.

== Pilot Facility ==
Ze-gen's demonstration facility is colocated with a processing facility owned by New Bedford Waste Services, LLC in New Bedford, Massachusetts. The facility was built to test the key parameters of the gasification process in order to more fully understand the chemistry of the system and the operating parameters. The plant became operational in November 2007, and Ze-gen achieved target synthesis gas quality in June 2008. The data and analysis collected during the Phase I testing helped to inform modifications and upgrades in the facility. Phase II testing began in September 2009. As of June 2011, the demonstration facility has logged over 4200 hours of operation, including 30 days of consecutive runtime.

== Commercial Facility ==
Ze-gen plans to develop its first commercial facility in Attleboro, Massachusetts. The proposed facility is to be located within the Attleboro Corporate Campus, a former Texas Instruments manufacturing facility and now the home to a number of businesses. Through the conversion of 44,000 tons of specific waste streams annually, the syngas produced at the facility will be used to generate approximately 7MW of alternative energy. The thermal and electrical power will be sold to tenants within the corporate campus, allowing the campus to reduce its reliance on fossil fuels. In April 2011, Ze-gen announced its decision to suspend its project in Attleboro in order to focus on developing its commercial facility project at a site with stronger energy markets and one that's more receptive to alternative energy development.

== Funding ==
As of 2009, Ze-gen has received $30 million in funding from sources including: Omar Zawawi Establishment, Flagship Ventures, VantagePoint Venture Partners, and Massachusetts Technology Development Corporation.

== See also ==
- Gasification
- Fischer-Tropsch
- Syngas
- Landfills
