= Xe than =

Vietnamese coal gas-powered minibus

Xe than (literally, "coal car") is the Vietnamese word for a minibus that has been converted to run on coal instead of gasoline. Typically, two tall tanks were mounted to the back of the vehicle, flanking the rear door. Periodically, the driver's assistant (lơ xe) would come around back to clear the tanks of soot using a metal pole.

This modification regained popularity in Vietnam during the subsidy period, when gasoline was in short supply. The modified vehicles were notorious for their short range, plodding pace, and dirty operation. Cyclists and motorcyclists, who commonly hitched onto automobiles for an easier ride, could get hurt from hot coal falling from the vehicle onto their faces. Those who stayed back were still at risk of falling coal getting in the way of their wheels.

Xe than became much less common during the Đổi Mới ("Renovation") period, when gasoline once again became widely accessible.

== See also ==
- Gasifier
- Plasma gasification
- Wood gas generator
