= Georges Imbert =

French inventor (1884–1950)

Georges Christian Peter Imbert (26 March 1884 – 6 February 1950) was a French chemical engineer and inventor. He became famous for the invention of the wood gas generator.

== Early life ==
On 26 March 1884 Imbert was born in Niederstinzel, France, a small town about ten kilometers from Sarre-Union. He was the oldest of four children.

After primary school in Diemeringen, he attended Sarreguemines High School. Because of his academic success, his father enrolled him at the School of Chemistry Mulhouse, which at that time was one of the most famous in Europe. Three years later Imbert acquired a degree in chemical engineering; his interest in the subject led him to pursue his own research further.

At the age of 20 he filed his first patent. Over the next ten years he developed various industrial processes and filed several additional patents for them.

In 1908 he opened a soap factory in Diemeringen where he applied many of the industrial processes he had patented. He also worked as a research scientist in Manchester.

From 1915 to 1918 Imbert was enlisted in the German army where he worked as a chemist in the factory "Königswarter and Ebell" in Linden and in the factory "Pintsch" in Berlin.

After he was demobilized in 1918, Imbert produced soap at the mill in Diemeringen.

== Invention of the wood gas generator ==
At the same time Georges Imbert embarked on experiments to transform coal into liquid fuel. He even managed to make synthetic gasoline; however, it was too expensive. By then he had abandoned the liquid fuel solution and became interested in gas generators. In the early 1920s he created a generator that utilized charcoal.

In 1921 Imbert built a charcoal gasifier and two years later he succeeded in gasification for a vehicle.

In 1923, the Army, informed by De Dietrich of the invention, asked Imbert to build a wood gasifier for the French government. Imbert set up his gas-fired plant (1925) at Sarre-Union, rue de Bitche, in a hat factory. De Dietrich, which had the industrial capacity in metallurgy and the automobile, set up a workshop for him at Reichshoffen. In 1925, he patented various processes on gas generators. De Dietrich, for their part also filed a patent on gasogens, which pushed Imbert to end this partnership in 1926.

After buying the "Chalet", a beautiful home in Sarre-Union, he created the Compagnie Générale des Gazogens Imbert in 1930.

Despite the enthusiasm of André Maginot, Minister of War, the gasifier struggled to break through in France. In 1931, Georges Imbert was forced to sell some of his licenses to his representative in Germany.

In 1934, his brother, Jean-Paul, tried to sell gasogen to the United States.

The success in Germany allowed Imbert to continue developing his technique in Sarre-Union. He was developing a gasifier that could use green wood without clogging the engine.

During the evacuation of Sarre-Union in May 1940, he moved with his family to Epinal in the Vosges. On his return in September of the same year, he returned to work by becoming an employee of his former company bought by "Imbert Köln".

The recognition of Georges Imbert's work in 1944 by all the European manufacturers marks the celebration of the life of the chemical engineer. The German press called him the "pope" of the gasifier. Germany used the wood gasifier in all military operations on tanks, armored cars and ammunition trucks.

== End of life ==
Having lost a son on the Russian front and feeling responsible, Imbert became an alcoholic.

In December 1944, Sarre-Union was released by the Americans. Georges Imbert was not imprisoned for working for the Germans. However, his property was sequestrated and sold as war damage in 1945. Imbert lost interest in everything and died a few years later, in 1950, at the age of 65.
