= Producer gas =

Obsolete form of gas fuel

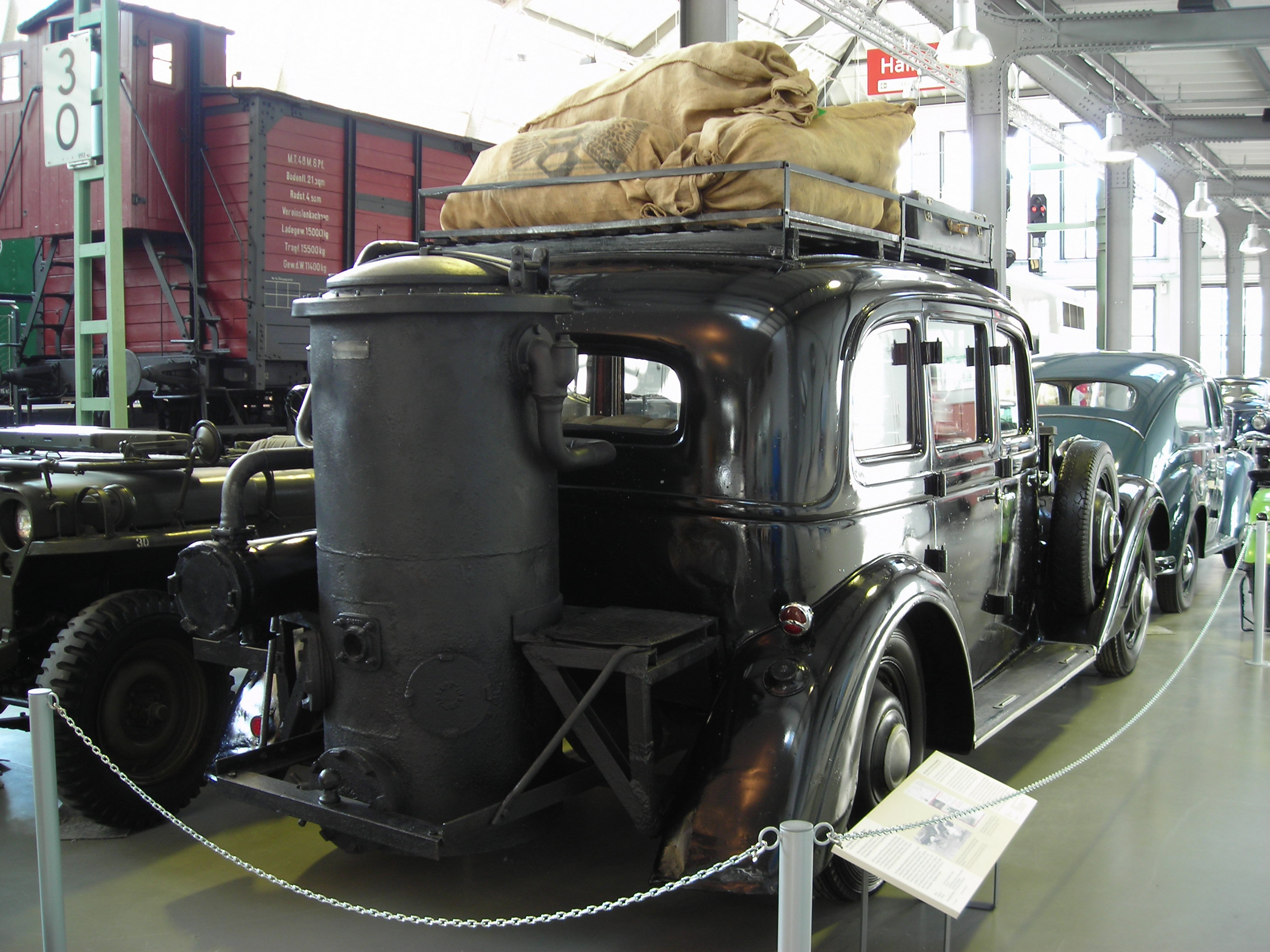
Adler Diplomat with WW II-era wood gas generator

Producer gas is a fuel gas manufactured by blowing air and steam simultaneously through a coke or coal fire. It mainly consists of carbon monoxide (CO), hydrogen (H_{2}), as well as substantial amounts of nitrogen (N_{2}). The caloric value of the producer gas is low (mainly because of its high nitrogen content), and the technology is obsolete. Improvements over producer gas, also obsolete, include water gas, where the solid fuel is treated intermittently with air and steam, and, far more efficiently, synthesis gas, where the solid fuel is replaced with methane.

In the US, producer gas may also be referred to by other names based on the fuel used for production, such as wood gas. Producer gas may also be referred to as suction gas, referring to the way the air was drawn into the gas generator by an internal combustion engine.

== Etymology ==
The names for this combustible gas across different European languages reflect either the mechanical apparatus used for its creation or the specific chemical process of its generation.

=== English: Producer gas ===
The term Producer gas is derived from the industrial equipment used to manufacture it: the "gas producer". In the 19th century, a "producer" referred to a furnace—typically a shaft furnace—designed to "produce" a combustible gas through the incomplete combustion of solid fuel (such as coal or coke). Unlike "coal gas," which was distilled in a retort, this gas was the direct result of a continuous industrial production cycle within the unit.

=== German: Generatorgas ===
In German-speaking regions, the gas is known as Generatorgas, referencing the generator. This term describes the shaft furnace where air is passed through a deep bed of incandescent fuel. The etymology emphasizes that the gas is "generated" by the chemical reduction of carbon dioxide into carbon monoxide within the unit.

=== Other European Names ===
The nomenclature across Europe often varies based on the specific patent or chemical additive involved:

- French (Gaz de gazogène / Gaz pauvre): In French, the term gaz de gazogène refers to the gazogène (gas producer) apparatus. It is also historically known as gaz pauvre ("poor gas" or "lean gas") because of its low calorific value compared to lighting gas (town gas), due to the high concentration of atmospheric nitrogen.
- Russian (Генераторный газ): Similar to the German naming convention, the Russian generatornyy gaz literally translates to "generator gas," focusing on the device used for the gasification process.
- Mond gas: A common European variant of producer gas, named after the chemist Ludwig Mond. This version utilized a steam-air blast to recover ammonia as a byproduct, leading to its identification as a distinct chemical "brand" in late 19th-century industrial centers.
- Halbwassergas (Semi-water gas): A technical term used in German and English contexts to describe a hybrid gas produced by a "generator" using both air and steam. This name combines the etymologies of air-based "producer gas" and steam-based "water gas".

	Producer Gas (Generatorgas)	Semi-Water Gas (Halbwassergas)
Input	Air	Air + Steam
Reaction Type	Exothermic	Thermally balanced
Combustibles	CO (approx. 33%)	CO + H_{2} (max. 50%)

== Production ==
Producer gas is generally made from coke, or other carbonaceous material such as anthracite coal. Air is passed over the red-hot carbonaceous fuel and carbon monoxide is produced. The reaction is exothermic.

Formation of producer gas from air and carbon:

C + O_{2} → CO_{2}, +97,600 calories/mol
CO_{2} + C → 2CO, –38,800 calories/mol (mol of the reaction formula)
2C + O_{2} → 2CO, +58,800 calories/mol (per mol of O_{2} i.e. per mol of the reaction formula)

Reactions between steam and carbon:

H_{2}O + C → H_{2} + CO, –28,800 calories/mol (presumably mol of the reaction formula)
2H_{2}O + C → 2H_{2} + CO_{2}, –18,800 calories/mol (presumably mol of the reaction formula)

Reaction between steam and carbon monoxide:

H_{2}O + CO → CO_{2} + H_{2}, +10,000 calories/mol (presumably mol of the reaction formula)
CO_{2} + H_{2} → CO + H_{2}O, –10,000 calories/mol (presumably mol of the reaction formula)

The average composition of ordinary producer gas according to Latta was: CO_{2}: 5.8%; O_{2}: 1.3%; CO: 19.8%; H_{2}: 15.1%; CH_{4}: 1.3%; N_{2}: 56.7%; B.T.U. gross per cu.ft 136 The concentration of carbon monoxide in the "ideal" producer gas was considered to be 34.7% carbon monoxide (carbonic oxide) and 65.3% nitrogen.

After "scrubbing", to remove tar, the gas may be used to power gas turbines (which are well-suited to fuels of low calorific value), spark ignited engines (where 100% petrol fuel replacement is possible) or diesel internal combustion engines (where 15% to 40% of the original diesel fuel requirement is still used to ignite the gas).

During World War II in Britain, plants were built in the form of trailers for towing behind commercial vehicles, especially buses, to supply gas as a replacement for petrol (gasoline) fuel. A range of about 80 miles for every charge of anthracite was achieved.

In old movies and stories, when there is a description of suicide by "turning on the gas" and leaving an oven door open without lighting the flame, the reference was to coal gas or town gas. As this gas contained a significant amount of carbon monoxide, it was quite toxic. Most town gas was also odorized, if it did not have its own odor. Modern 'natural gas' used in homes is far less toxic, and has a mercaptan added to it for odor for identifying leaks.

== Alternative names ==
Various names are used for producer gas, air gas and water gas generally depending on the fuel source, process or end use including:

- Air gas: also called "power gas", "generator gas", or "Siemens' producer gas". Produced from various fuels by partial combustion with air. Air gas consists principally of carbon monoxide with nitrogen from the air used and a small amount of hydrogen. This term is not commonly used, and tends to be used synonymously with wood gas.
- Producer gas: Air gas modified by simultaneous injection of water or steam to maintain a constant temperature and obtain a higher heat content gas by enrichment of air gas with H_{2}. Current usage often includes air gas.
- Semi-water gas: Producer gas.
- Blue water-gas: Air, water or producer gas produced from clean fuels such as coke, charcoal and anthracite which contain insufficient hydrocarbon impurities for use as illuminating gas. Blue gas burns with a blue flame and does not produce light except when used with a Welsbach gas mantle.
- Lowe's Water Gas: Water gas with a secondary pyrolysis reactor to introduce hydrocarbon gasses for illuminating purposes.
- Carburetted gas: Any gas produced by a process similar to Lowe's in which hydrocarbons are added for illumination purposes.
- Wood gas: produced from wood by partial combustion. Sometimes used in a gasifier to power cars with ordinary internal combustion engines.

Other similar fuel gasses

- Coal gas or illuminating gas: Produced from coal by distillation.
- Water gas: Produced by injection of steam into fuel preheated by combustion with air. The reaction is endothermic so the fuel must be continually re-heated to keep the reaction going. This was usually done by alternating the steam with an air stream. This name is sometimes used incorrectly when describing carburetted blue water gas simply as blue water gas.
- Coke oven gas: Coke ovens give off a gas exactly similar to illuminating gas, part of which is used to heat the coal. There may be a large excess, however, which is used for industrial purposes after it has been purified.
- Syngas, or synthesis gas: (from synthetic gas or synthesis gas) can be applied to any of the above gasses, but generally refers to modern industrial processes, such as natural gas reforming, hydrogen production, and processes for synthetic production of methane and other hydrocarbons.
- City (Town) gas: any of the above-manufactured gases including producer gas containing sufficient hydrocarbons to produce a bright flame for illumination purposes, originally produced from coal, for sale to consumers and municipalities.

== Advantages ==
- There is no loss due to smoke and convection current.
- Quantity of air required for the combustion of producer gas is not much above the theoretical quantity; when burning solid fuel, far more than the theoretical quantity is required. With solid fuels, the larger quantity of exhaust takes away considerable heat with it.
- Producer gas is more easily transmitted than solid fuel.
- Gas-fired furnaces can be maintained at a constant temperature.
- With gas, an oxidising and reducing flame can be obtained.
- Heat loss due to converting solid fuel into producer gas can be made in an economic way.
- Smoke nuisance can be avoided.
- Producer gas can be produced even by the poorest quality of fuel.
- When used in a large furnace no scrubbing is required.

Scrubbing is necessary in a small furnace to avoid choking small burners, and for using internal combustion engines.

== See also ==
- Fuel gas
- Gasification
- Gasifier
- History of manufactured gas
- Town Gas
- Pyrolysis
- Water gas
- Wood gas
