= Alfa Romeo 110AF =

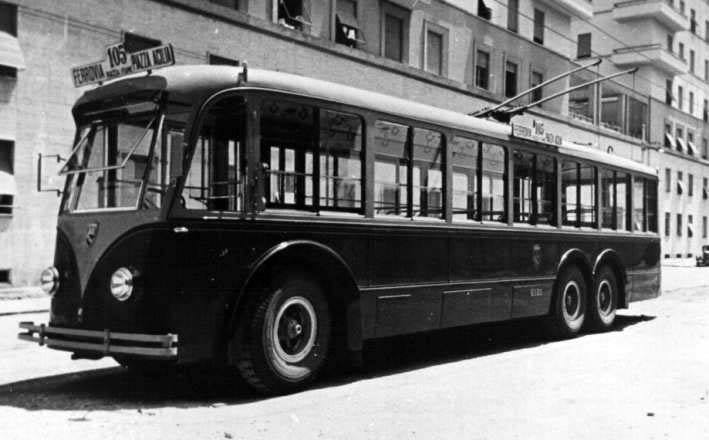
110AF premiere in Viale Eritrea in Roma, 1938

Alfa Romeo 110AF in Gdynia, 1949

Alfa Romeo 110AF is an Italian trolleybus presented in 1938 by Alfa Romeo and built until 1949. It replaced the Alfa Romeo 85AF from 1936. It was an electrically powered design with three axles; most examples had central seating for the driver but some later examples had the driver's seat to the right (AF/8). The 110AF was generally retired by 1965/1966 in Italy. In total, around 360 examples were built.

== Design ==
The 110AF was based on the diesel-engined 110A family of buses, first presented in 1934. These large buses used significant amounts of fuel and were built in small numbers. The 110AF used a variety of electric motors producing around 100 kW (136 PS). The 110AF was 12 metres (39 ft) long and had three axles. With 45 seats, it had a capacity for 89 people. Regular production ended in 1948; some of the last examples had their coachwork completed in 1949.

The original AF/1 model had two motors producing around 80 PS (59 kW) each and driving one axle each. The later AF/2, which began appearing in 1939, had a single motor producing 125 PS (92 kW), increasing to 140 PS (103 kW) by 1943.

== History ==
This model of trolleybus was in use in Rome, Milan, Naples, Genoa and Salerno until 1973 which is testimony of its long life. The biggest operator was the city of Rome, who purchased 30 110AF/1 and around 130 AF/2s; another significant user was ATAN Napoli, which used 22 units. Rome only accepted the trolley bus after trial installations proved that the wires would not disturb the views of historical monuments in the city. Three examples which had been looted by the Germans from Rome were repatriated from Esslingen in December 1948, rebuilt, and rebodied by Varesina in 1951. These three examples went on to serve in Milan until 1973.

As Germany did not have the capacity to supply their cities with trolleybuses, they initially bought but later requisitioned (after Italy signed the Armistice) several dozen Alfa Romeos, mainly from Rome. These were used in Berlin, Mainz, Cologne, Linz, Innsbruck, Gdynia, and other cities. The three Macchi-bodied examples sent to Gdynia were brought back into service in 1946 and served there for many years. These had two electrical engines by Magneti Marelli producing 80 PS (58.6 kW) and powering one each of the rear axles.

== See also ==
- List of buses
