= Sectional cooler =

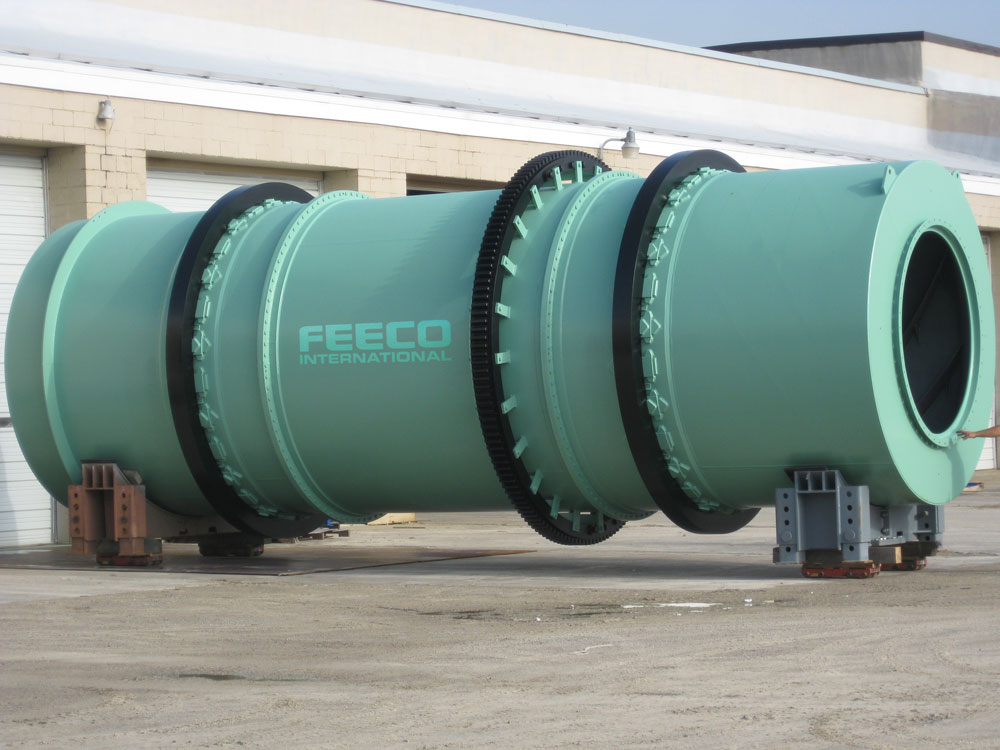
Rotary cooler

A sectional cooler is a type of liquid cooled rotary drum cooler used for continuous processes in chemical engineering. Sectional coolers consist of a rotating cylinder ("drum" or "shell"), a drive unit and a support structure. At each end of the drum there are stationary chutes for material feed and outlet. Depending on the size of the cooler the drum is pivoted on a shaft running through its axis, or is supported on running treads or external ring gears. The interior of the drum consists of several wedge-shaped chambers arranged around a central hollow shaft. This arrangement is completely surrounded by a jacket of water. In the wedge-shaped chambers are angled fins or shovels which move material through the cooler as the drum is rotated.

== Function ==
Sectional coolers work by indirectly cooling the material passing through them with water. The water enters the cooler and reaches the space between the wedge-shaped chambers through the central hollow shaft, circulates between and around the chambers then leaves the cooler. The material to be cooled usually falls into the feed chute directly from another machine. As the drum rotates, the fins on the inside faces of the wedge-shaped sections convey the material to other end of the cooler. The rotation causes a constant mixing of the product in the chambers, providing good heat transfer and increasing efficiency. Sectional coolers can be rotated by chains, gears or by friction drive onto the drum itself.

== Applications ==
Any free flowing bulk material can be cooled in a sectional cooler. They are often found after rotary kilns in calcination or other similar processes. The purpose of sectional coolers is usually to reduce the material temperature enough that it can be handled with other machines such as conveyor belts and mills. Often the cooling itself is also an important part in the production process. Typical products processed with sectional coolers include calcined petroleum coke, zinc calcine, soda ash and pigments. The entry temperature of the products can reach up to 1400 °C.

== See also ==
- Rotary dryer
- Rotary kiln
