= Rotary dryer =

Industrial machine for drying materials

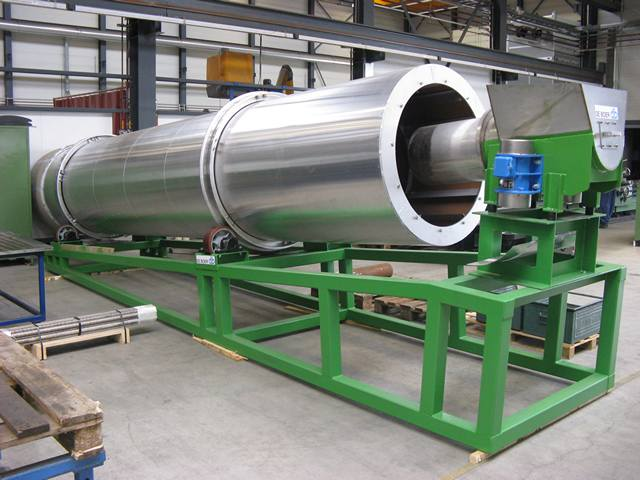
A rotary dryer

A rotary dryer is a type of industrial dryer used to reduce or minimize the moisture content of the material it is handling by bringing it into contact with a heated gas. The dryer is made up of a rotating cylinder ("drum" or "shell"), a drive mechanism, and a support structure (commonly concrete posts or a steel frame). The cylinder is inclined slightly with the discharge end is lower than the material feed end so that material moves through the dryer under the influence of gravity. Material to be dried enters the dryer and, as the dryer rotates, the material is lifted up by a series of fins (known as flights) lining the inner wall of the dryer. When the material gets high enough, it falls back down to the bottom of the dryer, passing through the hot gas stream as it falls.

== Applications ==
Rotary Dryers have many applications but are most commonly seen in the mineral industry for drying sand, stone, soil, and ore. They are also used in the food industry for granular material such as grains, cereals, pulses, and coffee beans.

== Design ==
A wide variety of rotary dryer designs are available for different applications. Gas flow, heat source, and drum design all affect the efficiency and suitability of a dryer for different materials.

=== Gas flow ===
The stream of hot gas can either be moving toward the discharge end from the feed end (known as co-current flow), or toward the feed end from the discharge end (known as counter-current flow). The direction of gas flow combined with the inclination of the drum determine how quickly material moves through the dryer.

=== Heat source ===
The gas stream is most commonly heated with a burner using gas, coal or oil. If the hot gas stream is made up of a mixture of air and combustion gases from a burner, the dryer is known as "directly heated". Alternatively, the gas stream may consist of air or another (sometimes inert) gas that is preheated. Where burner combustion gases do not enter the dryer, the dryer is known as "indirectly-heated". Often, indirectly heated dryers are used when product contamination is a concern. In some cases, a combination of direct-indirect heated rotary dryers are also used to improve the overall efficiency.

=== Drum design ===
A rotary dryer can consist of a single shell or several concentric shells, though any more than three shells is not usually necessary. Multiple drums can reduce the amount of space that the equipment requires to achieve the same throughput. Multi-drum dryers are often heated directly by oil or gas burners. The addition of a combustion chamber at the feed end helps ensure efficient fuel usage, and homogenous drying air temperatures.

=== Combined processes ===
Some rotary dryers have the ability to combine other processes with drying. Other processes that can be combined with drying include cooling, cleaning, shredding and separating.

== See also ==
- Fluidized bed
- Flights (rotary dryer)
- Sectional cooler
- Kiln
