= Gasification =

Form of energy conversion

Gasification is a process that converts biomass- or fossil fuel-based carbonaceous materials into gases, including as the largest fractions: dinitrogen (N_{2}), carbon monoxide (CO), dihydrogen (H_{2}), and carbon dioxide (CO_{2}). This is achieved by reacting the feedstock material at high temperatures (typically >700 °C), without combustion, via controlling the amount of oxygen and/or steam present in the reaction. The resulting gas mixture is called syngas (from synthesis gas) or producer gas and is itself a fuel due to the flammability of the H_{2} and CO of which the gas is largely composed. Power can be derived from the subsequent combustion of the resultant gas, and is considered to be a source of renewable energy if the gasified compounds were obtained from biomass feedstock.

An advantage of gasification is that syngas can be more efficient than direct combustion of the original feedstock material because it can be combusted at higher temperatures so that the thermodynamic upper limit to the efficiency defined by Carnot's rule is higher. Syngas may also be used as the hydrogen source in fuel cells, however, the syngas produced by most gasification systems requires additional processing and reforming to remove the contaminants and other gases such as CO and CO_{2} to be suitable for low-temperature fuel cell use, but high-temperature solid oxide fuel cells are capable of directly accepting mixtures of H_{2}, CO, CO_{2}, steam, and methane.

Syngas is most commonly burned directly in gas engines, used to produce methanol and hydrogen, or converted via the Fischer–Tropsch process into synthetic fuel. For some materials gasification can be an alternative to landfilling and incineration, resulting in lowered emissions of atmospheric pollutants such as methane and particulates. Some gasification processes aim at refining out corrosive ash elements such as chloride and potassium, allowing clean gas production from otherwise problematic feedstock material. Gasification of fossil fuels is currently widely used on industrial scales to generate electricity. Gasification can generate lower amounts of some pollutants as SO_{x} and NO_{x} than combustion.

== History ==
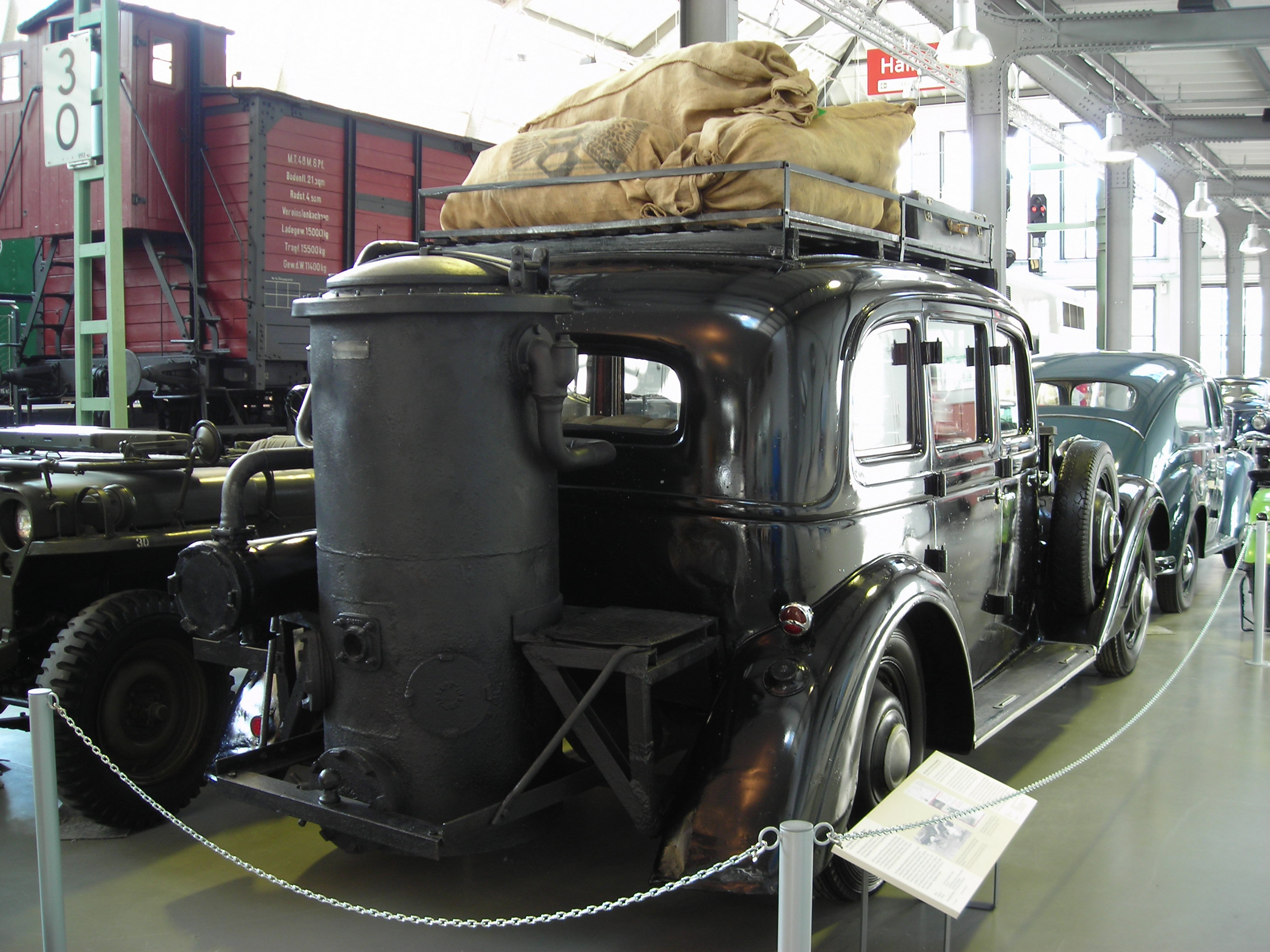
Adler Diplomat 3 with gas generator (1941)

Energy has been produced at industrial scale via gasification since the early 19th century. Initially coal and peat were gasified to produce town gas for lighting and cooking, with the first public street lighting installed in Pall Mall, London on January 28, 1807, spreading shortly to supply commercial gas lighting to most industrialized cities until the end of the 19th century when it was replaced with electrical lighting. Gasification and syngas continued to be used in blast furnaces and more significantly in the production of synthetic chemicals where it has been in use since the 1920s. The thousands of sites left toxic residue. Some sites have been remediated, while others are still polluted.

During both world wars, especially the World War II, the need for fuel produced by gasification reemerged due to the shortage of petroleum. Wood gas generators, called Gasogene or Gazogène, were used to power motor vehicles in Europe. By 1945 there were trucks, buses and agricultural machines that were powered by gasification. It is estimated that there were close to 9,000,000 vehicles running on producer gas all over the world.

Another example, the Xe than (literally, "coal car" in Vietnamese) was a minibus that has been converted to run on coal instead of gasoline. This modification regained popularity in Vietnam during the subsidy period, when gasoline was in short supply. Xe than became much less common during the Đổi Mới period, when gasoline became widely accessible again.

== Chemical reactions ==
In a gasifier, the carbonaceous material undergoes several different processes:

Pyrolysis of carbonaceous fuels

Gasification of char

1. The dehydration or drying process occurs at around 100 °C. Typically the resulting steam is mixed into the gas flow and may be involved with subsequent chemical reactions, notably the water-gas reaction if the temperature is sufficiently high (see step #5).
2. The pyrolysis (or devolatilization) process occurs at around 200–300 °C. Volatiles are released and char is produced, resulting in up to 70% weight loss for coal. The process is dependent on the properties of the carbonaceous material and determines the structure and composition of the char, which will then undergo gasification reactions.
3. The combustion process occurs as the volatile products and some of the char react with oxygen to primarily form carbon dioxide and small amounts of carbon monoxide, which provides heat for the subsequent gasification reactions. Letting C represent a carbon-containing organic compound, the basic reaction here is C + O_{2} → CO_{2}.
4. The gasification process occurs as the char reacts with steam and carbon dioxide to produce carbon monoxide and hydrogen, via the reactions C + H_{2}O → H_{2} + CO and C + CO_{2} → 2CO.
5. In addition, the reversible gas phase water-gas shift reaction reaches equilibrium very fast at the temperatures in a gasifier. This balances the concentrations of carbon monoxide, steam, carbon dioxide and hydrogen: CO + H_{2}O ⇌ CO_{2} + H_{2}.

In essence, a limited amount of oxygen or air is introduced into the reactor to allow some of the organic material to be "burned" to produce carbon dioxide and energy, which drives a second reaction that converts further organic material to hydrogen and additional carbon dioxide. Further reactions occur when the formed carbon monoxide and residual water from the organic material react to form methane and excess carbon dioxide (4CO + 2H_{2}O → CH_{4} + 3CO_{2}). This third reaction occurs more abundantly in reactors that increase the residence time of the reactive gases and organic materials, as well as heat and pressure. Catalysts are used in more sophisticated reactors to improve reaction rates, thus moving the system closer to the reaction equilibrium for a fixed residence time.

Hydrogasification is a gasification process where hydrogen is used in place of oxygen to produce methane/natural gas from coal or biomass.

== Processes ==
Main gasifier types

Several types of gasifiers are currently available for commercial use: counter-current fixed bed, co-current fixed bed, fluidized bed, entrained flow, plasma, and free radical.

=== Counter-current fixed bed ("up draft") gasifier ===
A fixed bed of carbonaceous fuel (e.g. coal or biomass) through which the "gasification agent" (steam, oxygen and/or air) flows in counter-current configuration. The ash is either removed in the dry condition or as a slag. The slagging gasifiers have a lower ratio of steam to carbon, achieving temperatures higher than the ash fusion temperature. The nature of the gasifier means that the fuel must have high mechanical strength and must ideally be non-caking so that it will form a permeable bed, although recent developments have reduced these restrictions to some extent. The throughput for this type of gasifier is relatively low. Thermal efficiency is high as the temperatures in the gas exit are relatively low. However, this means that tar and methane production is significant at typical operation temperatures, so product gas must be extensively cleaned before use. The tar can be recycled to the reactor.

In the gasification of fine, undensified biomass such as rice hulls, it is necessary to blow air into the reactor by means of a fan. This creates very high gasification temperature, as high as 1000 C. Above the gasification zone, a bed of fine and hot char is formed, and as the gas is blow forced through this bed, most complex hydrocarbons are broken down into simple components of hydrogen and carbon monoxide.

=== Co-current fixed bed ("down draft") gasifier ===
Similar to the counter-current type, but the gasification agent gas flows in co-current configuration with the fuel (downwards, hence the name "down draft gasifier"). Heat needs to be added to the upper part of the bed, either by combusting small amounts of the fuel or from external heat sources. The produced gas leaves the gasifier at a high temperature, and most of this heat is often transferred to the gasification agent added in the top of the bed, resulting in an energy efficiency on level with the counter-current type. Since all tars must pass through a hot bed of char in this configuration, tar levels are much lower than the counter-current type.

=== Fluidized bed reactor ===
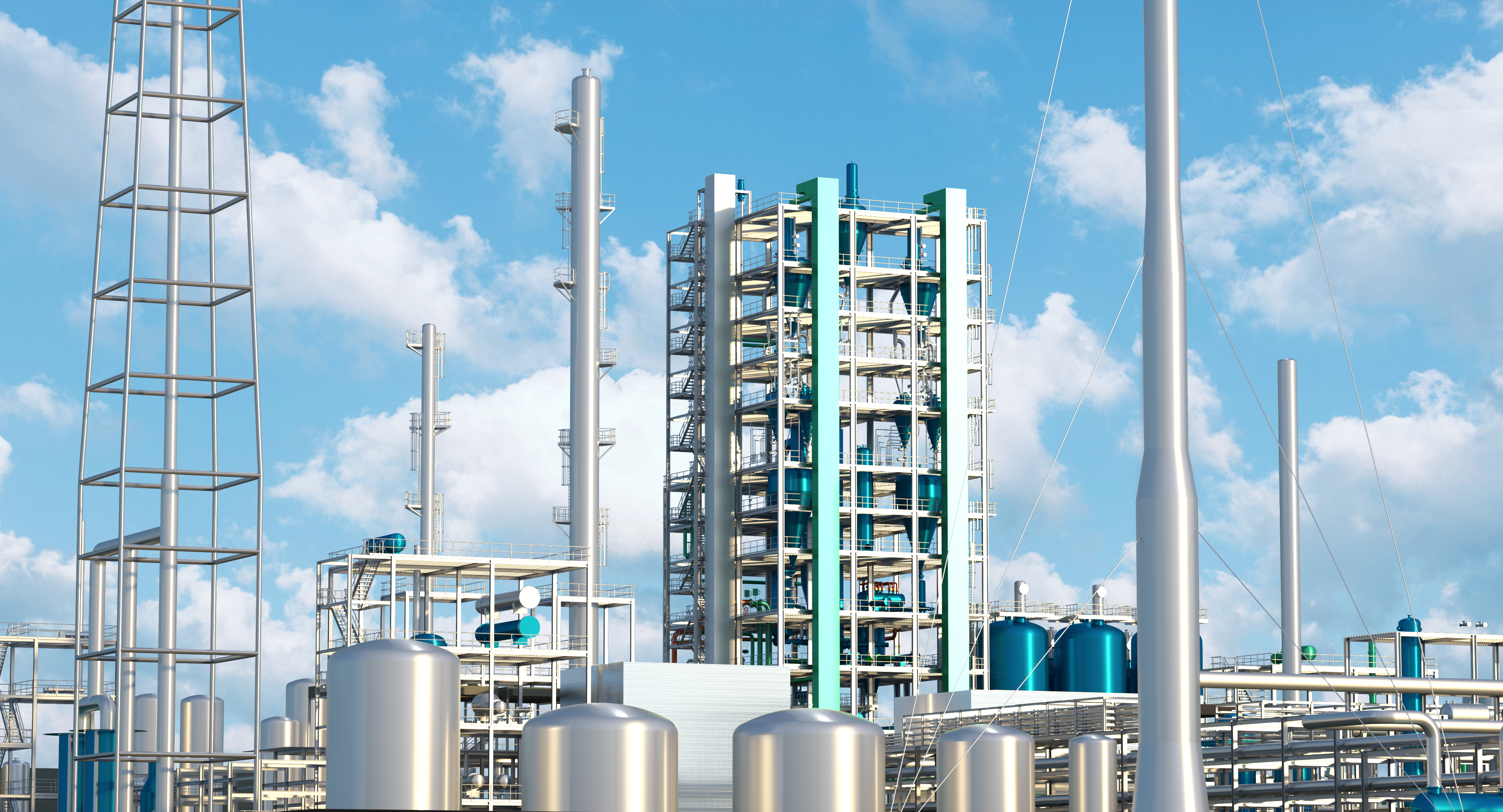
Visualisation of proposed fluidized bed gasification facility in Amsterdam designed to convert waste materials into biofuels

The fuel is fluidized in oxygen and steam or air. The ash is removed dry or as heavy agglomerates that defluidize. The temperatures are relatively low in dry ash gasifiers, so the fuel must be highly reactive; low-grade coals are particularly suitable. The agglomerating gasifiers have slightly higher temperatures, and are suitable for higher rank coals. Fuel throughput is higher than for the fixed bed, but not as high as for the entrained flow gasifier. The conversion efficiency can be rather low due to elutriation of carbonaceous material. Recycle or subsequent combustion of solids can be used to increase conversion. Fluidized bed gasifiers are most useful for fuels that form highly corrosive ash that would damage the walls of slagging gasifiers. Biomass fuels generally contain high levels of corrosive ash.

Fluidized bed gasifiers uses inert bed material at a fluidized state which enhance the heat and biomass distribution inside a gasifier. At a fluidized state, the superficial fluid velocity is greater than the minimum fluidization velocity required to lift the bed material against the weight of the bed. Fluidized bed gasifiers are divided into Bubbling Fluidized Bed (BFB), Circulating Fluidized Bed (CFB) and Dual Fluidized Bed (DFB) gasifiers.

=== Entrained flow gasifier ===
A dry pulverized solid, an atomized liquid fuel or a fuel slurry is gasified with oxygen (much less frequent: air) in co-current flow. The gasification reactions take place in a dense cloud of very fine particles. Most coals are suitable for this type of gasifier because of the high operating temperatures and because the coal particles are well separated from one another.

The high temperatures and pressures also mean that a higher throughput can be achieved; however, thermal efficiency is somewhat lower, as the gas must be cooled before it can be cleaned with existing technology. The high temperatures also mean that tar and methane are not present in the product gas; however, the oxygen requirement is higher than for the other types of gasifiers. All entrained flow gasifiers remove the major part of the ash as a slag, as the operating temperature is well above the ash fusion temperature.

A smaller fraction of the ash is produced either as a very fine dry fly ash or as a black-colored fly ash slurry. Some fuels, in particular certain types of biomasses, can form slag that is corrosive for ceramic inner walls that serve to protect the gasifier outer walls. However, some entrained-flow–type gasifiers do not have ceramic inner walls but an inner water- or steam-cooled wall covered with partially solidified slag. This type of gasifier does not suffer from corrosive slags.

Some fuels have ashes with very high ash fusion temperatures. In this case mostly limestone is mixed with the fuel prior to gasification. Addition of a little limestone will usually suffice for lowering the fusion temperatures. The fuel particles must be much smaller than for other types of gasifiers. This means the fuel must be pulverized, which requires somewhat more energy than for the other types of gasifiers. By far the most energy consumption related to entrained-flow gasification is not the milling of the fuel but the production of oxygen used for the gasification.

=== Plasma gasifier ===
In a plasma gasifier a high-voltage current is fed to a torch, creating a high-temperature arc. The inorganic residue is retrieved as a glass like substance.

== Feedstock ==
There are a large number of different feedstock types for use in a gasifier, each with different characteristics, including size, shape, bulk density, moisture content, energy content, chemical composition, ash fusion characteristics, and homogeneity of all these properties. Coal and petroleum coke are used as primary feedstocks for many large gasification plants worldwide. Additionally, a variety of biomass and waste-derived feedstocks can be gasified, with wood pellets and chips, waste wood, plastics and aluminium, Municipal Solid Waste (MSW), Refuse-derived fuel (RDF), agricultural and industrial wastes, sewage sludge, switch grass, discarded seed corn, corn stover and other crop residues all being used.

Chemrec has developed a process for gasification of black liquor.

=== Waste disposal ===
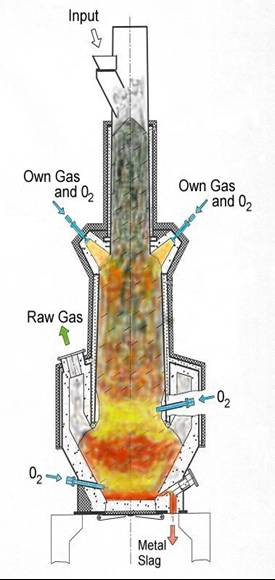
HTCW reactor, one of several proposed waste gasification processes

Waste gasification has several advantages over incineration:

- The necessary extensive flue gas cleaning may be performed on the syngas instead of the much larger volume of flue gas after combustion.
- Electric power may be generated in engines and gas turbines, which are much cheaper and more efficient than the steam cycle used in incineration. Even fuel cells may potentially be used, but these have rather severe requirements regarding the purity of the gas.
- Chemical processing (Gas to liquids) of the syngas may produce other synthetic fuels instead of electricity.
- Some gasification processes treat ash containing heavy metals at very high temperatures so that it is released in a glassy and chemically stable form.

A major challenge for waste gasification technologies is to reach an acceptable (positive) gross electric efficiency. The high efficiency of converting syngas to electric power is counteracted by significant power consumption in the waste preprocessing, the consumption of large amounts of pure oxygen (which is often used as gasification agent), and gas cleaning. Another challenge becoming apparent when implementing the processes in real life is to obtain long service intervals in the plants, so that it is not necessary to close down the plant every few months for cleaning the reactor.

Environmental advocates have called gasification "incineration in disguise" and argue that the technology is still dangerous to air quality and public health. "Since 2003 numerous proposals for waste treatment facilities hoping to use... gasification technologies failed to receive final approval to operate when the claims of project proponents did not withstand public and governmental scrutiny of key claims," according to the Global Alliance for Incinerator Alternatives. One facility which operated from 2009 to 2011 in Ottawa had 29 "emissions incidents" and 13 "spills" over those three years. It was also only able to operate roughly 25% of the time.

Several waste gasification processes have been proposed, but few have yet been built and tested, and only a handful have been implemented as plants processing real waste, and most of the time in combination with fossil fuels.

One plant (in Chiba, Japan, using the Thermoselect process) has been processing industrial waste with natural gas and purified oxygen since year 2000, but has not yet documented positive net energy production from the process.

In 2007 Ze-gen erected a waste gasification demonstration facility in New Bedford, Massachusetts. The facility was designed to demonstrate gasification of specific non-MSW waste streams using liquid metal gasification. This facility came after widespread public opposition shelved plans for a similar plant in Attleboro, Massachusetts. Today Ze-gen appears to be defunct, and the company website was taken down in 2014.

Also in the US, in 2011 a plasma system delivered by PyroGenesis Canada Inc. was tested to gasify municipal solid waste, hazardous waste and biomedical waste at the Hurlburt Field Florida Special Operations Command Air Force base. The plant, which cost $7.4 million to construct, was closed and sold at a government liquidation auction in May 2013. The opening bid was $25. The winning bid was sealed.

In December 2022, the Sierra BioFuels Plant opened in Reno, Nevada, converting landfill waste to synthetic crude oil. The plant was shut down in 2024, its owner, Fulcrum BioEnnergy Inc, filed for bankruptcy protection.

== Current applications ==
Syngas can be used for heat production and for generation of mechanical and electrical power. Like other gaseous fuels, producer gas gives greater control over power levels when compared to solid fuels, leading to more efficient and cleaner operation.

Syngas can also be used for further processing to liquid fuels or chemicals.

=== Heat ===
Gasifiers offer a flexible option for thermal applications, as they can be retrofitted into existing gas fueled devices such as ovens, furnaces, boilers, etc., where syngas may replace fossil fuels. Heating values of syngas are generally around 4–10 MJ/m^{3}.

=== Electricity ===
Currently Industrial-scale gasification is primarily used to produce electricity from fossil fuels such as coal, where the syngas is burned in a gas turbine. Gasification is also used industrially in the production of electricity, ammonia and liquid fuels (oil) using Integrated Gasification Combined Cycles (IGCC), with the possibility of producing methane and hydrogen for fuel cells. IGCC is also a more efficient method of CO_{2} capture as compared to conventional technologies. IGCC demonstration plants have been operating since the early 1970s and some of the plants constructed in the 1990s are now entering commercial service.

=== Combined heat and power ===
In small business and building applications, where the wood source is sustainable, 250–1000 kWe and new zero carbon biomass gasification plants have been installed in Europe that produce tar free syngas from wood and burn it in reciprocating engines connected to a generator with heat recovery. This type of plant is often referred to as a wood biomass CHP unit but is a plant with seven different processes: biomass processing, fuel delivery, gasification, gas cleaning, waste disposal, electricity generation and heat recovery.

=== Transport fuel ===
Diesel engines can be operated on dual fuel mode using producer gas. Diesel substitution of over 80% at high loads and 70–80% under normal load variations can easily be achieved. Spark ignition engines and solid oxide fuel cells can operate on 100% gasification gas. Mechanical energy from the engines may be used for e.g. driving water pumps for irrigation or for coupling with an alternator for electrical power generation.

While small scale gasifiers have existed for well over 100 years, there have been few sources to obtain a ready-to-use machine. Small scale devices are typically DIY projects. However, currently in the United States, several companies offer gasifiers to operate small engines.

=== Renewable energy and fuels ===
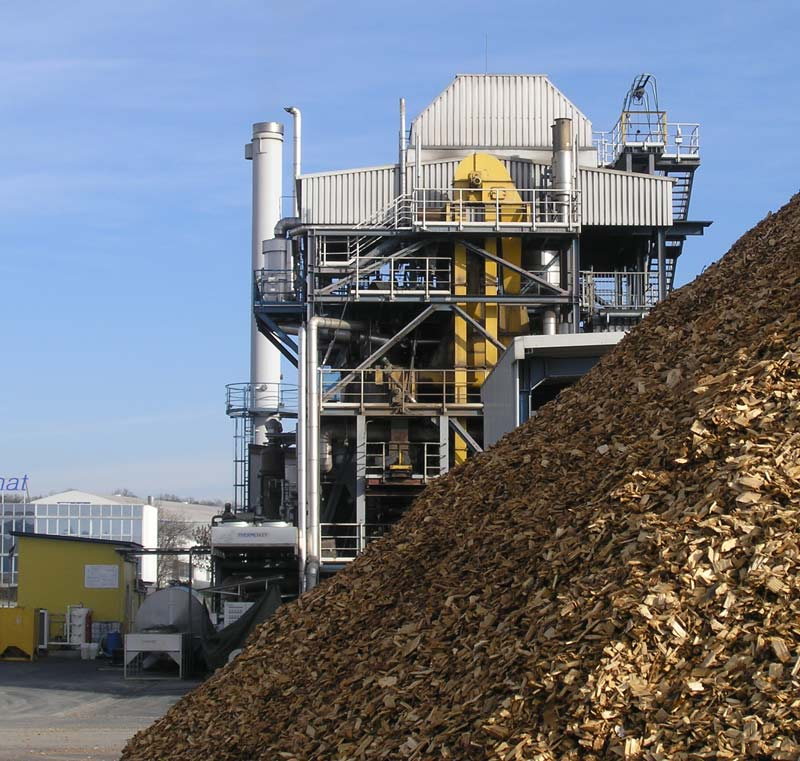
Gasification plant, Güssing, Austria (2001–2015)

In principle, gasification can proceed from just about any organic material, including biomass and plastic waste. The resulting syngas can be combusted. Alternatively, if the syngas is clean enough, it may be used for power production in gas engines, gas turbines or even fuel cells, or converted efficiently to dimethyl ether (DME) by methanol dehydration, methane via the Sabatier reaction, or diesel-like synthetic fuel via the Fischer–Tropsch process. In many gasification processes most of the inorganic components of the input material, such as metals and minerals, are retained in the ash. In some gasification processes (slagging gasification) this ash has the form of a glassy solid with low leaching properties, but the net power production in slagging gasification is low (sometimes negative) and costs are higher.

Regardless of the final fuel form, gasification itself and subsequent processing neither directly emits nor traps greenhouse gases such as carbon dioxide. Power consumption in the gasification and syngas conversion processes may be significant though, and may indirectly cause CO_{2} emissions; in slagging and plasma gasification, the electricity consumption may even exceed any power production from the syngas.

Combustion of syngas or derived fuels emits exactly the same amount of carbon dioxide as would have been emitted from direct combustion of the initial fuel. Biomass gasification and combustion could play a significant role in a renewable energy economy, because biomass production removes the same amount of CO_{2} from the atmosphere as is emitted from gasification and combustion. While other biofuel technologies such as biogas and biodiesel are carbon neutral, gasification in principle may run on a wider variety of input materials and can be used to produce a wider variety of output fuels.

There are at present a few industrial scale biomass gasification plants. Since 2008 in Svenljunga, Sweden, a biomass gasification plant generates up to 14 MW_{th}, supplying industries and citizens of Svenljunga with process steam and district heating, respectively. The gasifier uses biomass fuels such as CCA or creosote impregnated waste wood and other kinds of recycled wood to produces syngas that is combusted on site.

Examples of demonstration projects include:

- The 32 MW dual fluidized bed gasification of the GoBiGas project in Gothenburg, Sweden, produced around 20 MW of substitute natural gas from forest residues and fed it into the natural gas grid since December 2014. The plant was permanently closed due to technical and economical problems in April 2018. Göteborg Energi had invested 175 million euro in the plant and intensive attempts to sell the plant to new investors had failed for a year.
- Those of the Renewable Energy Network Austria, including a plant using dual fluidized bed gasification that has supplied the town of Güssing with 2 MW of electricity, produced utilising GE Jenbacher reciprocating gas engines and 4 MW of heat, generated from wood chips, since 2001. The plant was decommissioned in 2015.
- Go Green Gas' pilot plant in Swindon, UK has demonstrated methane production from waste feedstocks at 50 kW. The project has prompted the construction of a £25million commercial facility that aims to generate 22GWh per annum of grid-quality natural gas from waste wood and refuse derived fuel, due for completion in 2018.
- Chemrec's pilot plant in Piteå that produced 3 MW of clean syngas from entrained flow gasification of black liquor. The plant was closed down permanently due to financial problems in 2016
- The High Temperature Winkler (HTW), a pressurized circulating fluidized bed gasification process. During the 1990s HTW was tested with a variety of different feedstocks, including low-rank coals and various forms of biomass; wood, refuse derived fuel (RDF) and municipal solid waste (MSW). The last HTW facility closed permanently in 2002. Since 2015 tests of the process continues at a 0.1 t/h pilot unit at Darmstadt University, while redesigned full-scale units are proposed in Amsterdam and Rotterdam

== See also ==
- Coal gasification
- Fluidized bed combustion
- History of manufactured gas
- Isle of Wight gasification facility
- List of solid waste treatment technologies
- Plasma arc waste disposal
- Renewable natural gas
- Water gas
- Outdoor wood-fired boiler
- Chemical looping reforming and gasification
- Sublimation (phase transition)
