= HECA =

HECA may refer to:

- Higher Education Colleges Association, a representative body of independent third level colleges in Ireland
- Hospital de Emergencias Clemente Álvarez, an emergency hospital and trauma center in Rosario, Argentina
- Hydrogen Energy California, a defunct alternative energy, hydrogen power project
- HECA, the ICAO code for Cairo International Airport, Egypt
