= Coal gasification =

Production of syngas from coal

In industrial chemistry, coal gasification is the process of producing syngas—a mixture consisting primarily of carbon monoxide (CO), hydrogen (H_{2}), carbon dioxide (CO_{2}), methane (CH_{4}), and water vapour (H_{2}O)—from coal and water, air and/or oxygen.

Historically, coal was gasified to produce coal gas, also known as "town gas". Coal gas is combustible and was used for heating and municipal lighting, before the advent of large-scale extraction of natural gas from oil wells. Coal gasification may be phased out in order to get to net zero greenhouse gas emissions. However, coal usage, including gasification, continues to increase globally.

In current practice, large-scale coal gasification installations are primarily for electricity generation (both in conventional thermal power stations and molten carbonate fuel cell power stations), or for production of chemical feedstocks. The hydrogen obtained from coal gasification can be used for various purposes such as making ammonia, powering a hydrogen economy, or upgrading fossil fuels. Coal gasification is also used to produce methane for natural gas demand.

Alternatively, coal-derived syngas can be converted into transportation fuels such as gasoline and diesel through additional treatment, or into methanol which itself can be used as transportation fuel or fuel additive, or which can be converted into gasoline.

When hydrogen is used in place of oxygen/air, the coal gasification process is called hydrogasification. Natural gas from coal gasification can be cooled until it liquifies for use as a fuel in the transport sector.

== History ==
In the past, coal was converted to make coal gas, which was piped to customers to burn for illumination, heating, and cooking. High prices of oil and natural gas led to increased interest in "BTU Conversion" technologies such as gasification, methanation and liquefaction. The Synthetic Fuels Corporation was a U.S. government-funded corporation established in 1980 to create a market for alternatives to imported fossil fuels (such as coal gasification). The corporation was discontinued in 1985.

=== Early history of coal gas production by carbonization ===
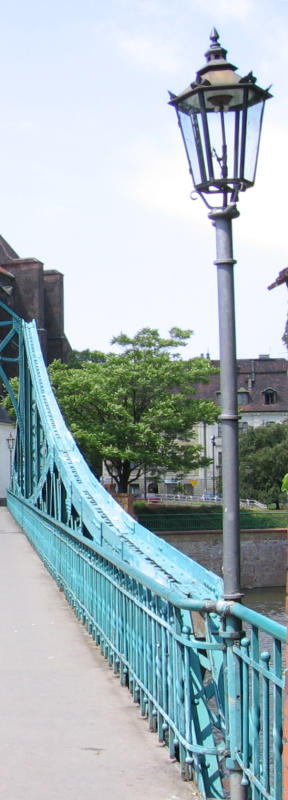
Gas lighting in historical center of Wrocław, Poland

The Flemish scientist Jan Baptista van Helmont used the name "gas" in his Origins of Medicine (c. 1609) to describe his discovery of a "wild spirit" which escaped from heated wood and coal, and which "differed little from the chaos of the ancients". Similar experiments were carried out in 1681 by Johann Becker of Munich and in 1684 by John Clayton of Wigan, England. The latter called it "Spirit of the Coal". William Murdoch (later known as Murdock) discovered new ways of making, purifying and storing gas. Among others, he illuminated his house at Redruth and his cottage at Soho, Birmingham in 1792, the entrance to the Manchester Police Commissioners premises in 1797, the exterior of the factory of Boulton and Watt in Birmingham, and a large cotton mill in Salford, Lancashire in 1805.

Professor Jan Pieter Minckeleers lit his lecture room at the University of Louvain in 1783 and Lord Dundonald lit his house at Culross, Scotland, in 1787, the gas being carried in sealed vessels from the local tar works. In France, Philippe le Bon patented a gas fire in 1799 and demonstrated street lighting in 1801. Other demonstrations followed in France and in the United States, but, it is generally recognized that the first commercial gas plant was built by the London and Westminster Gas Light and Coke Company in Great Peter Street in 1812 laying wooden pipes to illuminate Westminster Bridge with gas lights on New Year's Eve in 1813. In 1816, Rembrandt Peale and four others established the Gas Light Company of Baltimore, the first manufactured gas company in America. The first German gas plant was built in Hannover in 1825 and by 1870 there were 340 gas plants in Germany making town gas from coal, wood, peat and other materials.

Working conditions in the Gas Light and Coke Company's Horseferry Road Works, London, in the 1830s were described by a French visitor, Flora Tristan, in her Promenades Dans Londres:

Two rows of furnaces on each side were fired up; the effect was not unlike the description of Vulcan's forge, except that the Cyclopes were animated with a divine spark, whereas the dusky servants of the English furnaces were joyless, silent and benumbed.... The foreman told me that stokers were selected from among the strongest, but that nevertheless they all became consumptive after seven or eight years of toil and died of pulmonary consumption. That explained the sadness and apathy in the faces and every movement of the hapless men.

The first public piped gas supply was to 13 gas lamps, each with three glass globes along the length of Pall Mall, London in 1807. The credit for this goes to the inventor and entrepreneur Fredrick Winsor and the plumber Thomas Sugg, who made and laid the pipes. Digging up streets to lay pipes required legislation and this delayed the development of street lighting and gas for domestic use. Meanwhile, William Murdoch and his pupil Samuel Clegg were installing gas lighting in factories and work places, encountering no such impediments.

=== Early history of coal gas production by gasification ===
In the 1850s every small to medium-sized town and city had a gas plant to provide for street lighting. Subscribing customers could also have piped lines to their houses. By this era, gas lighting became accepted. Gaslight trickled down to the middle class and later came gas cookers and stoves.

The 1860s were the golden age of coal gas development. Scientists like Kekulé and Perkin cracked the secrets of organic chemistry to reveal how gas is made and its composition. From this came better gas plants and Perkin's purple dyes, such as Mauveine. In the 1850s, processes for making Producer gas and Water gas from coke were developed. Unenriched water gas may be described as Blue water gas (BWG).

Mond gas, developed in the 1850s by Ludwig Mond, was producer gas made from coal instead of coke. It contained ammonia and coal tar and was processed to recover these valuable compounds.

Blue water gas (BWG) burns with a non-luminous flame which makes it unsuitable for lighting purposes. Carburetted Water Gas (CWG), developed in the 1860s, is BWG enriched with gases obtained by spraying oil into a hot retort. It has a higher calorific value and burns with a luminous flame.

The carburetted water gas process was improved by Thaddeus S. C. Lowe in 1875. The gas oil was fixed into the BWG via thermocracking in the carburettor and superheater of the CWG generating set. CWG was the dominant technology in the US from the 1880s until the 1950s, replacing coal gasification. CWG has a CV of 20 MJ/m^{3} i.e. slightly more than half that of natural gas.

=== Development of the coal gas industry in the UK ===
The advent of incandescent gas lighting in factories, homes and in the streets, replacing oil lamps and candles with steady clear light, almost matching daylight in its colour, turned night into day for many—making night shift work possible in industries where light was all important—in spinning, weaving and making up garments etc. The social significance of this change is difficult for generations brought up with lighting after dark available at the touch of a switch to appreciate. Not only was industrial production accelerated, but streets were made safe, social intercourse facilitated and reading and writing made more widespread. Gas plants were built in almost every town, main streets were brightly illuminated and gas was piped in the streets to the majority of urban households. The invention of the gas meter and the pre-payment meter in the late 1880s played an important role in selling town gas to domestic and commercial customers.

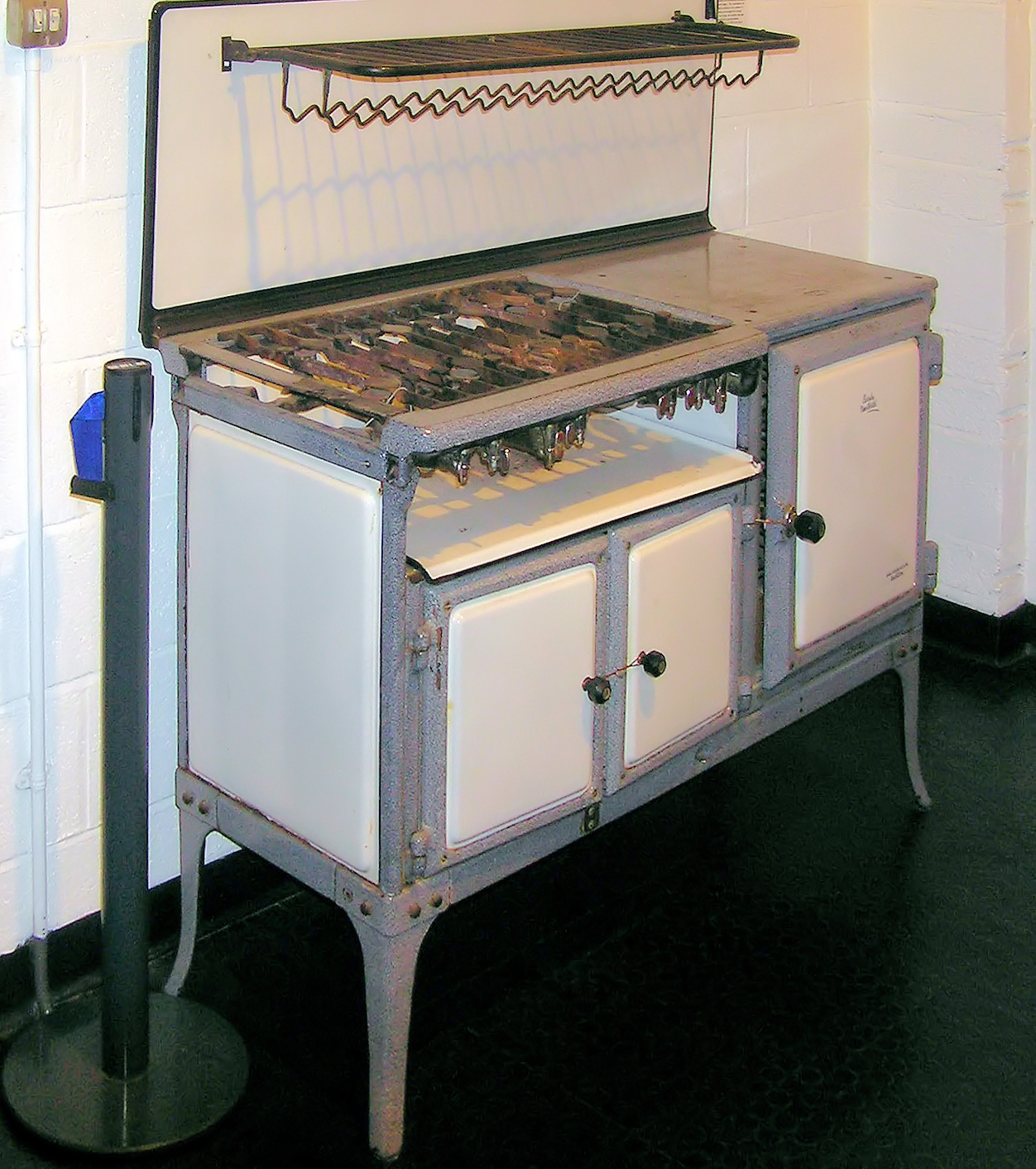
1934 gas cooker in England

The education and training of the large workforce, the attempts to standardise manufacturing and commercial practices and the moderating of commercial rivalry between supply companies prompted the founding of associations of gas managers, first in Scotland in 1861. A British Association of Gas Managers was formed in 1863 in Manchester and this, after a turbulent history, became the foundation of the Institute of Gas Engineers (IGE). In 1903, the reconstructed Institution of Civil Engineers (ICE) initiated courses for students of gas manufacture in the City and Guilds of London Institute. The IGE was granted the Royal Charter in 1929. Universities were slow to respond to the needs of the industry and it was not until 1908 that the first Professorship of Coal Gas and Fuel Industries was founded at the University of Leeds. In 1926, the Gas Light and Coke Company opened Watson House adjacent to Nine Elms Gas plants. At first, this was a scientific laboratory. Later it included a centre for training apprentices but its major contribution to the industry was its gas appliance testing facilities, which were made available to the whole industry, including gas appliance manufacturers. Using this facility, the industry established not only safety but also performance standards for both the manufacture of gas appliances and their servicing in customers' homes and commercial premises.

During World War I, the gas industry's by-products, phenol, toluene and ammonia and sulphurous compounds were valuable ingredients for explosives. Much coal for the gas plants was shipped by sea and was vulnerable to enemy attack. The gas industry was a large employer of clerks, mainly male before the war. But the advent of the typewriter and the female typist made another important social change that was, unlike the employment of women in war-time industry, to have long-lasting effects.

The inter-war years were marked by the development of the continuous vertical retort which replaced many of the batch fed horizontal retorts. There were improvements in storage, especially the waterless gas holder, and distribution with the advent of 2–4 inch steel pipes to convey gas at up to 50 psi (340 kPa) as feeder mains compared to the traditional cast iron pipes working at an average of 2–3 inches water gauge (500–750 Pa). Benzole as a vehicle fuel and coal tar as the main feedstock for the emerging organic chemical industry provided the gas industry with substantial revenues. Petroleum supplanted coal tar as the primary feedstock of the organic chemical industry after World War II and the loss of this market contributed to the economic problems of the gas industry after the war.

A wide variety of appliances and uses for gas developed over the years. Gas fires, gas cookers, refrigerators, washing machines, hand irons, pokers for lighting coal fires, gas-heated baths, remotely controlled clusters of gas lights, gas engines of various types and, in later years, gas warm air and hot water central heating and air conditioning, all of which made immense contributions to the improvement of the quality of life in cities and towns worldwide. The evolution of electric lighting made available from public supply extinguished the gas light, except where colour matching was practised as in haberdashery shops.

== Process ==
Scheme of a Lurgi gasifier

During gasification, the coal is blown through with oxygen and steam (water vapor) while also being heated (and in some cases pressurized). If the coal is heated by external heat sources the process is called "allothermal", while "autothermal" process assumes heating of the coal via exothermal chemical reactions occurring inside the gasifier itself. It is essential that the oxidizer supplied is insufficient for complete oxidizing (combustion) of the fuel. During the reactions mentioned, oxygen and water molecules oxidize the coal and produce a gaseous mixture of carbon dioxide (CO_{2}), carbon monoxide (CO), water vapour (H_{2}O), and molecular hydrogen (H_{2}). (Some by-products like tar, phenols, etc. are also possible end products, depending on the specific gasification technology utilized.) This process has been conducted in-situ within natural coal seams (referred to as underground coal gasification) and in coal refineries. The desired end product is usually syngas (i.e., a combination of H_{2} + CO), but the produced coal gas may also be further refined to produce additional quantities of H_{2}:

3C (i.e., coal) + O_{2} + H_{2}O → H_{2} + 3CO

If the refiner wants to produce alkanes (i.e., hydrocarbons present in natural gas, gasoline, and diesel fuel), the coal gas is collected at this state and routed to a Fischer–Tropsch reactor. If, however, hydrogen is the desired end-product, the coal gas (primarily the CO product) undergoes the water gas shift reaction where more hydrogen is produced by additional reaction with water vapor:

CO + H_{2}O → CO_{2} + H_{2}

Although other technologies for coal gasification currently exist, all employ, in general, the same chemical processes. For low-grade coals (i.e., lignite or other "brown coals") which contain significant amounts of water, there are technologies in which no steam is required during the reaction, with coal (carbon) and oxygen being the only reactants. As well, some coal gasification technologies do not require high pressures. Some utilize pulverized coal as fuel while others work with relatively large fractions of coal. Gasification technologies also vary in the way the blowing is supplied.

"Direct blowing" assumes the coal and the oxidizer being supplied towards each other from the opposite sides of the reactor channel. In this case the oxidizer passes through coke and (more likely) ashes to the reaction zone where it interacts with coal. The hot gas produced then passes fresh fuel and heats it while absorbing some products of thermal destruction of the fuel, such as tars and phenols. Thus, the gas requires significant refining before being used in the Fischer–Tropsch reaction. Products of the refinement are highly toxic and require special facilities for their utilization. As a result, the plant utilizing the described technologies has to be very large to be economically efficient. One of such plants called SASOL is situated in the South Africa. It was built due to embargo applied to the country preventing it from importing oil and natural gas. South Africa is rich in bituminous coal and anthracite and was able to arrange the use of the well known high pressure "Lurgi" gasification process developed in Germany in the first half of 20th century.

"Reversed blowing" (as compared to the previous type described which was invented first) assumes the coal and the oxidizer being supplied from the same side of the reactor. In this case there is no chemical interaction between coal and oxidizer before the reaction zone. The gas produced in the reaction zone passes solid products of gasification (coke and ashes), and CO_{2} and H_{2}O contained in the gas are additionally chemically restored to CO and H_{2}. As compared to the "direct blowing" technology, no toxic by-products are present in the gas: those are disabled in the reaction zone. This type of gasification has been developed in the first half of 20th century, along with the "direct blowing", but the rate of gas production in it is significantly lower than that in "direct blowing" and there were no further efforts of developing the "reversed blowing" processes until 1980-s when a Soviet research facility KATEKNIIUgol' (R&D Institute for developing Kansk-Achinsk coal field) began R&D activities to produce the technology now known as "TERMOKOKS-S" process. The reason for reviving the interest in this type of gasification process is that it is ecologically clean and able to produce two types of useful products (simultaneously or separately): gas (either combustible or syngas) and middle-temperature coke. The former may be used as a fuel for gas boilers and diesel-generators or as syngas for producing gasoline, etc., the latter - as a technological fuel in metallurgy, as a chemical absorbent or as raw material for household fuel briquettes. Combustion of the product gas in gas boilers is ecologically cleaner than combustion of initial coal. Thus, a plant utilizing gasification technology with the "reversed blowing" is able to produce two valuable products of which one has relatively zero production cost since the latter is covered by competitive market price of the other. As the Soviet Union and its KATEKNIIUgol' ceased to exist, the technology was adopted by the individual scientists who originally developed it and is now being further researched in Russia and commercially distributed worldwide. Industrial plants utilizing it are now known to function in Ulaan-Baatar (Mongolia) and Krasnoyarsk (Russia).

Pressurized airflow bed gasification technology created through the joint development between Wison Group and Shell (Hybrid). For example: Hybrid is an advanced pulverized coal gasification technology, this technology combined with the existing advantages of Shell SCGP waste heat boiler, includes more than just a conveying system, pulverized coal pressurized gasification burner arrangement, lateral jet burner membrane type water wall, and the intermittent discharge has been fully validated in the existing SCGP plant such as mature and reliable technology, at the same time, it removed the existing process complications and in the syngas cooler (waste pan) and [fly ash] filters which easily failed, and combined the current existing gasification technology that is widely used in synthetic gas quench process. It not only retains the original Shell SCGP waste heat boiler of coal characteristics of strong adaptability, and ability to scale up easily, but also absorb the advantages of the existing quench technology.

=== Underground coal gasification ===
Underground coal gasification (UCG) is an industrial gasification process, which is carried out in non-mined coal seams. It involves injection of a gaseous oxidizing agent, usually oxygen or air, and bringing the resulting product gas to the surface through production wells drilled from the surface. The product gas can be used as a chemical feedstock or as fuel for power generation. The technique can be applied to resources that are otherwise not economical to extract. It also offers an alternative to conventional coal mining methods. Compared to traditional coal mining and gasification, UCG has less environmental and social impact, though environmental concerns exist, including the potential for aquifer contamination.

=== Carbon capture technology ===
Carbon capture, utilization, and sequestration (or storage) is increasingly being utilized in modern coal gasification projects to address the greenhouse gas emissions concern associated with the use of coal and carbonaceous fuels. In this respect, gasification has a significant advantage over conventional combustion of mined coal, in which CO_{2} resulting from combustion is considerably diluted by nitrogen and residual oxygen in the near-ambient pressure combustion exhaust, making it relatively difficult, energy-intensive, and expensive to capture the CO_{2} (this is known as "post-combustion" CO_{2} capture).

In gasification, on the other hand, oxygen is normally supplied to the gasifiers and just enough fuel is combusted to provide the heat to gasify the rest; moreover, gasification is often performed at elevated pressure. The resulting syngas is typically at higher pressure and not diluted by nitrogen, allowing for much easier, efficient, and less costly removal of CO_{2}. A 2025 review found that pre-combustion CO_{2} capture in IGCC systems can achieve over 90% efficiency, offering strong potential for decarbonizing coal utilization.

==== IGCC (Integrated Gasification Combined Cycle) based projects in the United States with CO_{2} capture and use/storage ====
Mississippi Power's Kemper Project was designed as a lignite-fuel IGCC plant, generating a net 524 MW of power from syngas, while capturing over 65% of CO_{2} generated using the Selexol process. The technology at the Kemper facility, Transport-Integrated Gasification (TRIG), was developed and is licensed by KBR. The CO_{2} will be sent by pipeline to depleted oil fields in Mississippi for enhanced oil recovery operations. The plant missed all its targets and plans for "clean coal" generation were abandoned in July 2017. The plant is expected to go ahead burning natural gas only.

Hydrogen Energy California (HECA) will be a 300MW net, coal and petroleum coke-fueled IGCC polygeneration plant (producing hydrogen for both power generation and fertilizer manufacture). Ninety percent of the CO_{2} produced will be captured (using Rectisol) and transported to Elk Hills Oil Field for EOR, enabling recovery of 5 million additional barrels of domestic oil per year. On March 4, 2016, the California Energy Commission ordered the HECA application to be terminated.

Summit's Texas Clean Energy Project (TCEP) will be a coal-fueled, IGCC-based 400MW power/polygeneration project (also producing urea fertilizer), which will capture 90% of its CO_{2} in pre-combustion using the Rectisol process. The CO_{2} not used in fertilizer manufacture will be used for enhanced oil recovery in the West Texas Permian Basin.

Plants such as the Texas Clean Energy Project which employ carbon capture and storage have been touted as a partial, or interim, solution to regulation issues if they can be made economically viable by improved design and mass production. There has been opposition from utility regulators and ratepayers due to increased cost; and from environmentalists such as Bill McKibben, who view any continued use of fossil fuels as counterproductive.

== Commercialization ==
According to the Gasification and Syngas Technologies Council, a trade association, there are globally 272 operating gasification plants with 686 gasifiers and 74 plants with 238 gasifiers under construction. Most of them use coal as feedstock.

As of 2017 large scale expansion of the coal gasification industry was occurring only in China where local governments and energy companies promote the industry to provide jobs and a market for coal. For the most part, the plants are located in remote, coal-rich areas.

The central government is aware of the conflicts with environmental goals: in addition to producing a great deal of carbon dioxide, the plants use a great deal of water in areas where water is scarce.

A pilot project for low grade coal (lignite) was undertaken at Thar Coal Mines (Pakistan) using their waste coal seams which were below the specification limits of the mine-mouth power plant (off-spec coal). Pilot plant was based on updraft gasification technology and utilized different blends of municipal solid waste with lignite off-spec coal to improve gasification efficiency and hydrogen production.

== Environmental impact ==
=== Environmental impact of manufactured coal gas industry ===
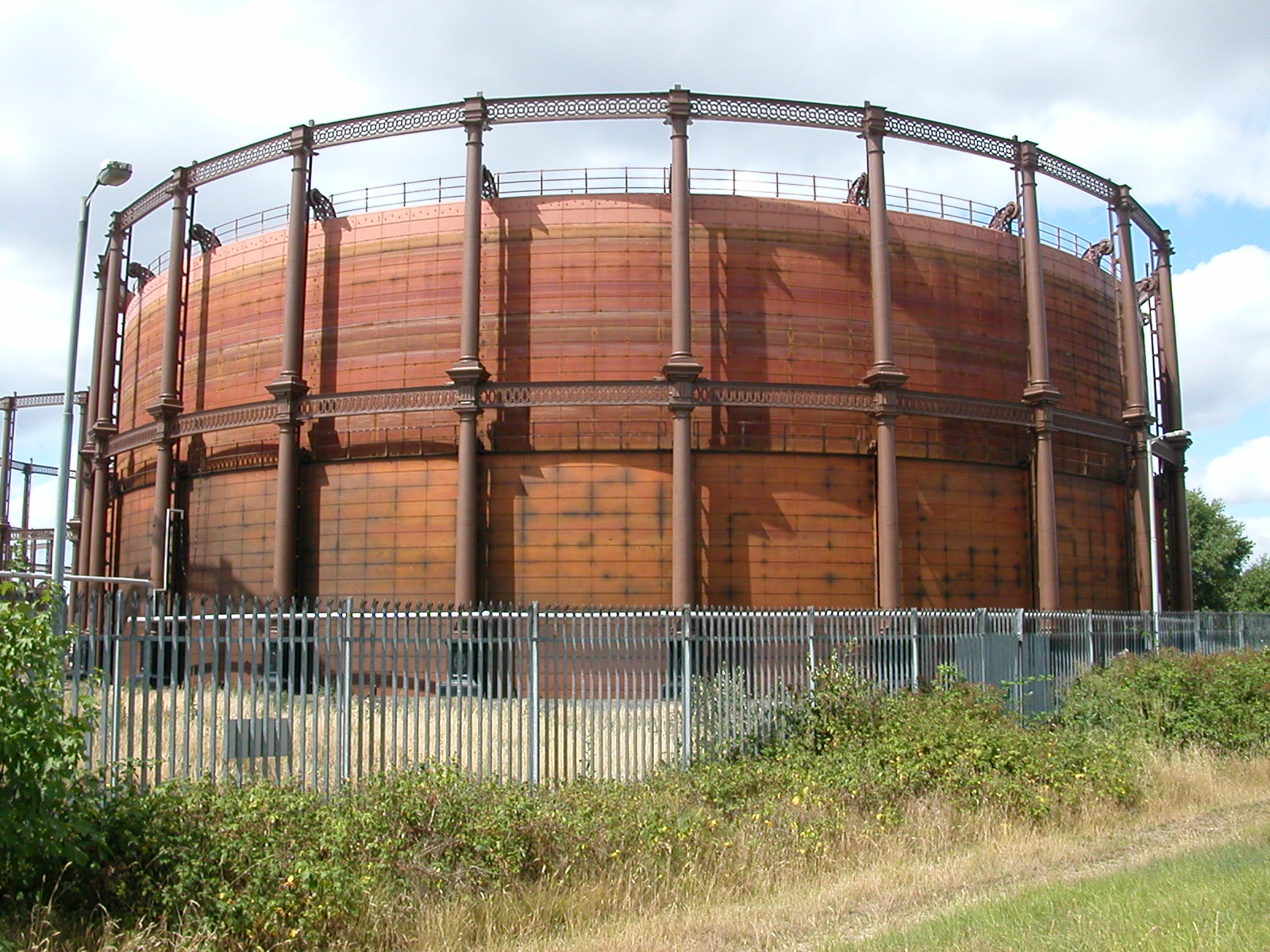
Gasometer at West Ham, United Kingdom

From its original development until the wide-scale adoption of natural gas, more than 50,000 manufactured gas plants were in existence in the United States alone. The process of manufacturing gas usually produced a number of by-products that contaminated the soil and groundwater in and around the manufacturing plant, so many former town gas plants are a serious environmental concern, and cleanup and remediation costs are often high. Manufactured gas plants (MGPs) were typically sited near or adjacent to waterways that were used to transport in coal and for the discharge of wastewater contaminated with tar, ammonia and/or drip oils, as well as outright waste tars and tar-water emulsions.

In the earliest days of MGP operations, coal tar was considered a waste and often disposed into the environment in and around the plant locations. While uses for coal tar developed by the late-19th century, the market for tar varied and plants that could not sell tar at a given time could store tar for future use, attempt to burn it as boiler fuel, or dump the tar as waste. Commonly, waste tars were disposed of in old gas holders, adits or even mine shafts (if present). Over time, the waste tars degrade with phenols, benzene (and other mono-aromatics—BTEX) and polycyclic aromatic hydrocarbons released as pollutant plumes that can escape into the surrounding environment. Other wastes included "blue billy", which is a ferroferricyanide compound—the blue colour is from Prussian blue, which was commercially used as a dye. Blue billy is typically a granular material and was sometimes sold locally with the strap line "guaranteed weed free drives". The presence of blue billy can give gas plant waste a characteristic musty/bitter almonds or marzipan smell which is associated with cyanide gas.

The shift to the Carburetted Water Gas process initially resulted in a reduced output of water gas tar as compared to the volume of coal tars. The advent of automobiles reduced the availability of naphtha for carburetion oil, as that fraction was desirable as motor fuel. MGPs that shifted to heavier grades of oil often experienced problems with the production of tar-water emulsions, which were difficult, time-consuming, and costly to break. (The cause of tar change water emulsions is complex and was related to several factors, including free carbon in the carburetion oil and the substitution of bituminous coal as a feedstock instead of coke.) The production of large volumes of tar-water emulsions quickly filled up available storage capacity at MGPs and plant management often dumped the emulsions in pits, from which they may or may not have been later reclaimed. Even if the emulsions were reclaimed, the environmental damage from placing tars in unlined pits remained. The dumping of emulsions (and other tarry residues such as tar sludges, tank bottoms, and off-spec tars) into the soil and waters around MGPs is a significant factor in the pollution found at former manufactured gas plants (known as "FMGPs" in environmental remediation) today.

Contaminants commonly associated with FMGPs include:

- BTEX
  - Diffused out from deposits of coal/gas tars
  - Leaks of carburetting oil/light oil
  - Leaks from drip pots, that collected condensible hydrocarbons from the gas
- Coal tar waste/sludge
  - Typically found in sumps of gas holders and decanting ponds.
  - Coal tar sludge has no resale value and so was always dumped.
- Volatile organic compounds
- Polycyclic aromatic hydrocarbons (PAHs)
  - Present in coal tar, gas tar, and pitch at significant concentrations.
- Heavy metals
  - Leaded solder for gas mains, lead piping, coal ashes.
- Cyanide
  - Purifier waste has large amounts of complex ferrocyanides in it.
- Lampblack
  - Only found where crude oil was used as gasification feedstock.
- Tar emulsions

Coal tar and coal tar sludges are frequently denser than water and are present in the environment as a dense non-aqueous phase liquid.

In the UK, a number of former gasworks sites have been redeveloped for residential and other uses (including the Millennium Dome), being seen as prime developable land within the confines of city boundaries. Such development opportunities are now leading to problems associated with planning and the Contaminated Land Regime and have recently been debated in the House of Commons.

=== Environmental impact of modern coal gasification ===
Coal gasification processes require controls and pollution prevention measures to mitigate pollutant emissions. Pollutants or emissions of concern in the context of coal gasification include primarily:

- Ash & slag

Non-slagging gasifiers produce dry ash similar to that produced by conventional coal combustion, which can be an environmental liability if the ash (typically containing heavy metals) is leachable or caustic, and if the ash must be stored in ash ponds. Slagging gasifiers, which are utilized at many of the major coal gasification applications worldwide, have considerable advantage in that ash components are fused into a glassy slag, capturing trace heavy metals in the non-leachable glassy matrix, rendering the material non-toxic. This non-hazardous slag has multiple beneficial uses such as aggregate in concrete, aggregate in asphalt for road construction, grit in abrasive blasting, roofing granules, etc.

- Carbon dioxide (CO_{2})

CO_{2} is of paramount importance in global climate change.

- Mercury
- Arsenic
- Particulate matter (PM)

Ash is formed in gasification from inorganic impurities in the coal. Some of these impurities react to form microscopic solids which can be suspended in the syngas produced by gasification.

- Sulfur dioxide (SO_{2})

Typically coal contains anywhere from 0.2 to 5 percent sulfur by dry weight, which converts to H_{2}S and COS in the gasifiers due to the high temperatures and low oxygen levels. These "acid gases" are removed from the syngas produced by the gasifiers by acid gas removal equipment prior to the syngas being burned in the gas turbine to produce electricity, or prior to its use in fuels synthesis.

- Nitrogen oxides (NO_{x})

(NO_{x}) refers to nitric oxide (NO) and nitrogen dioxide (NO_{2}). Coal usually contains between 0.5 and 3 percent nitrogen on a dry weight basis, most of which converts to harmless nitrogen gas. Small levels of ammonia and hydrogen cyanide are produced, and must be removed during the syngas cooling process. In the case of power generation, NO_{x} also can be formed downstream by the combustion of syngas in turbines.

== See also ==
- Edwardsport Power Station
- Fischer–Tropsch process
- Georgetown Coal Gasification Plant
- History of manufactured gas
- Kemper Project
- Sasol
- Secunda CTL
