= Tomasz Wiltowski =

Tomasz Wiltowski (September 23, 1949 – December 23, 2018) was a Polish-American chemical engineer, a professor of mechanical engineering and energy processes at Southern Illinois University and director of Advanced Coal and Energy Research Center in Carbondale, Illinois.

== Biography ==
Tomasz Stanislaw Wiltowski was born in Częstochowa, Poland (Silesian Voivodeship) on September 23, 1949, to Janusz Wiltowski and Danuta Ciszewska. He married Teresa Mietelska on September 29, 1977, in Kraków, Poland. They have two sons, Maciej Wiltowski of Chicago and Jacek Wiltowski of Carbondale and four grandchildren, Jackson, Maxwell, James and Zosia.

== Academic career ==
Tomasz S. Wiltowski received his M.Sc. in chemical engineering from Technical University, Kraków, Poland in 1974 and Ph.D. in catalysis from the Institute of Catalysis and Surface Chemistry, Polish Academy of Sciences in 1984. In 1985 he accepted a researcher position at Southern Illinois University Carbondale (SIUC). At SIUC, Wiltowski served as a professor at the Department of Mechanical Engineering and Energy Processes and Interim Director of the Materials Technology Center of Southern Illinois University at Carbondale, Illinois. His most recent role was Director of the Advanced Coal and Energy Research Center in Carbondale.

== Contributions ==
Wiltowski is known for his research on coal and biomass gasification, hydrogen production, Fisher-Tropsch synthesis of liquid fuels, heterogeneous catalysis, and other projects in energy technology. He collaborated with many graduate students and international scholars and has brought to SIUC some 40 research grants from state and federal agencies and private industry. He has contributed 59 articles in peer-reviewed journals, prepared 74 presentations in peer-reviewed and professional conferences, obtained three patents, and co-authored four professional books.

== Awards and honors ==
During his 34-year career, Tomasz Wiltowski was a recipient of many prestigious awards and in 2017 was appointed by the U.S. Secretary of Energy to serve on the National Coal Council.

- Juh Wah Chen outstanding Faculty Award, College of Engineering, SIUC, 2011.
- College Level Outstanding Teaching Award, College of Engineering, SIUC, 2010.
- Named a Distinguished Alumni of the Cracow University of Technology, Cracow, Poland, July 2008.
- College-Level Outstanding Scholar, College of Engineering, SIUC, March 2006.
- Dean Thomas Jefferson Outstanding Teaching Award - College of Engineering, SIUC, February 2006.
- Dean Kent Tempelmeyer Outstanding Scholar Award – College of Engineering, February 2006.
- Sigma Xi Research Honorary (Southern Illinois University Chapter), 1987.

== Selected works ==
The most frequently cited works by Wiltowski include:

- SB Lalvani, T Wiltowski, A Hübner, A Weston, N Mandich. Removal of hexavalent chromium and metal cations by a selective and novel carbon adsorbent. Carbon 36 (7-8), 1219-1226
- A Konieczny, K Mondal, T Wiltowski, P Dydo. 2008. Catalyst development for thermocatalytic decomposition of methane to hydrogen. International Journal of Hydrogen Energy 33 (1), 264-272
- K Mondal, H Lorethova, E Hippo, T Wiltowski, SB Lalvani. 2004. Reduction of iron oxide in carbon monoxide atmosphere—reaction controlled kinetics. Fuel Processing Technology 86 (1), 33-47

== See also ==
- Chemical engineering
- Chemical energy
- Hydrogen production
- Coal gasification
- Heterogeneous catalysis
