= History of manufactured fuel gases =

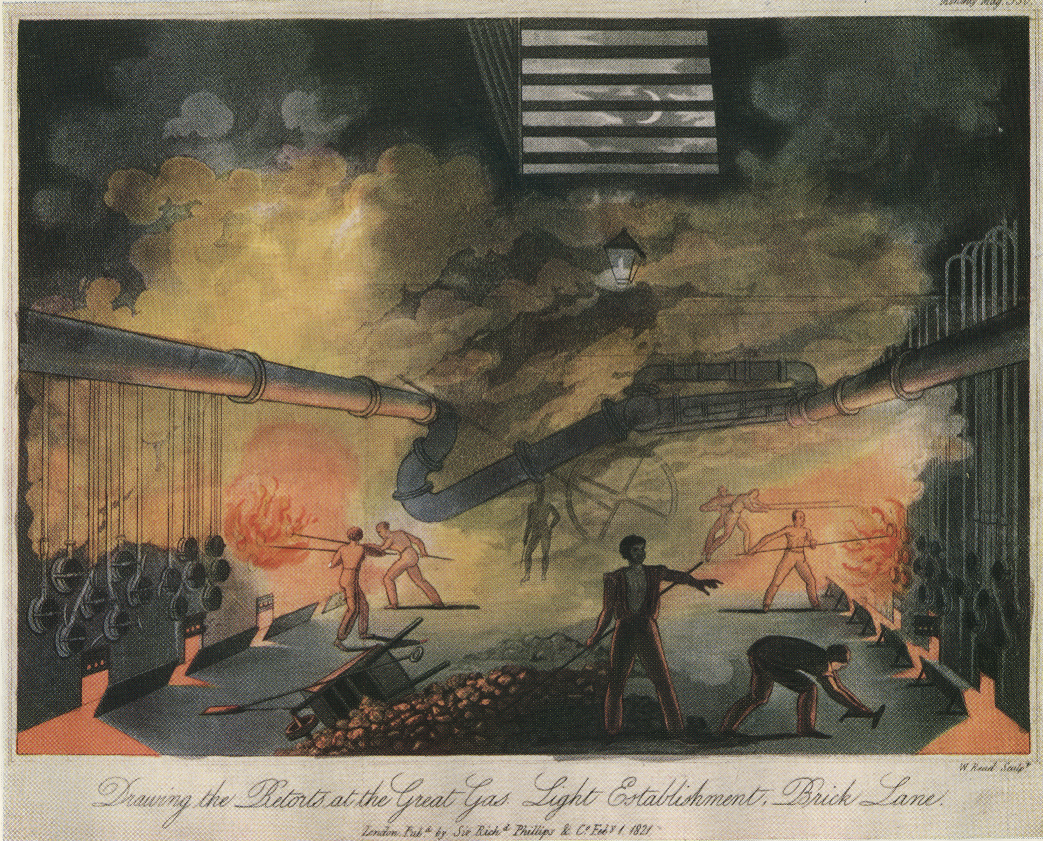
Drawing the retorts at the Great Gas Establishment Brick Lane, from The Monthly Magazine (1821)

The history of gaseous fuel, important for lighting, heating, and cooking purposes throughout most of the 19th century and the first half of the 20th century, began with the development of analytical and pneumatic chemistry in the 18th century. These "synthetic fuel gases" (also known as "manufactured fuel gas", "manufactured gas" or simply "gas") were made by gasification of combustible materials, usually coal, but also wood and oil, by heating them in enclosed ovens with an oxygen-poor atmosphere. The fuel gases generated were mixtures of many chemical substances, including hydrogen, methane, carbon monoxide and ethylene. Coal gas also contains significant quantities of unwanted sulfur and ammonia compounds, as well as heavy hydrocarbons, and must be purified before use.

The first attempts to manufacture fuel gas in a commercial way were made in the period 1795–1805 in France by Philippe LeBon, and in England by William Murdoch. Although precursors can be found, it was these two engineers who elaborated the technology with commercial applications in mind. Frederick Winsor was the key player behind the creation of the first gas utility, the London-based Gas Light and Coke Company, incorporated by royal charter in April 1812.

Manufactured gas utilities were founded first in England, and then in the rest of Europe and North America in the 1820s. The technology increased in scale. After a period of competition, the business model of the gas industry matured in monopolies, where a single company provided gas in a given zone. The ownership of the companies varied from outright municipal ownership, such as in Manchester, to completely private corporations, such as in London and most North American cities. Gas companies thrived during most of the nineteenth century, usually returning good profits to their shareholders, but were also the subject of many complaints over price.

The most important use of manufactured gas in the early 19th century was for gas lighting, as a convenient substitute for candles and oil lamps in the home. Gas lighting became the first widespread form of street lighting. This use called for gases that burned with a highly luminous flame, called "illuminating gases", Some gas mixtures of low intrinsic luminosity, such as blue water gas, were enriched with oil, for brightness.

In the second half of the 19th century, the manufactured fuel gas industry diversified from lighting to include heat and cooking uses. The threat from electrical light in the later 1870s and 1880s drove this trend strongly. The gas industry did not cede the gas lighting market to electricity immediately, as the invention of the Welsbach mantle, a refractory mesh bag heated to incandescence by a mostly non-luminous flame within, dramatically increased the efficiency of gas lighting. Acetylene was also used from about 1898 for gas cooking and gas lighting (see Carbide lamp) on a smaller scale, although its use too declined with the advent of electric lighting, and LPG for cooking. Other technological developments in the late nineteenth century include the use of water gas and machine stoking, although these were not universally adopted.

In the 1890s, pipelines from natural gas fields in Texas and Oklahoma were built to Chicago and other cities, and natural gas was used to supplement manufactured fuel gas supplies, eventually completely displacing it. Gas ceased to be manufactured in North America by 1966 (with the exception of Indianapolis and Honolulu), while it continued in Europe until the 1980s. "Manufactured gas" is again being evaluated as a fuel source, as energy utilities look towards coal gasification once again as a potentially cleaner way of generating power from coal, although nowadays such gases are likely to be called "synthetic natural gas".

== Early history of fuel gas ==
=== Precursors ===
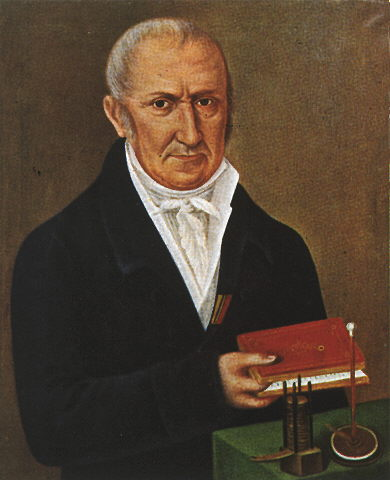
Alessandro Volta

Pneumatic chemistry developed in the eighteenth century with the work of scientists such as Stephen Hales, Joseph Black, Joseph Priestley, and Antoine-Laurent Lavoisier, and others. Until the eighteenth century, gas was not recognized as a separate state of matter. Rather, while some of the mechanical properties of gases were understood, as typified by Robert Boyle's experiments and the development of the air pump, their chemical properties were not. Gases were regarded in keeping the Aristotelian tradition of four elements as being air, one of the four fundamental elements. The different sorts of airs, such as putrid airs or inflammable air, were looked upon as atmospheric air with some impurities, much like muddied water.

After Joseph Black realized that carbon dioxide was in fact a different sort of gas altogether from atmospheric air, other gases were identified, including hydrogen by Henry Cavendish in 1766. Alessandro Volta expanded the list with his discovery of methane in 1776. It had also been known for a long time that inflammable gases could be produced from most combustible materials, such as coal and wood, through the process of distillation. Stephen Hales, for example, had written about the phenomenon in the Vegetable Staticks in 1722. In the last two decades of the eighteenth century, as more gases were being discovered and the techniques and instruments of pneumatic chemistry became more sophisticated, a number of natural philosophers and engineers thought about using gases in medical and industrial applications. One of the first such uses was ballooning beginning in 1783, but other uses soon followed.

One of the results of the ballooning craze of 1783–1784 was the first implementation of lighting by manufactured gas. A professor of natural philosophy at the University of Louvain Jan Pieter Minckeleers and two of his colleagues were asked by their patron, the Duke of Arenberg, to investigate ballooning. They did so, building apparatus to generate lighter than air inflammable gases from coal and other inflammable substances. In 1785 Minckeleers used some of this apparatus to gasify coal to light his lecture hall at the university. He did not extend gas lighting much beyond this, and when he was forced to flee Leuven during the Brabant Revolution, he abandoned the project altogether.

=== Philippe LeBon and the Thermolamp ===
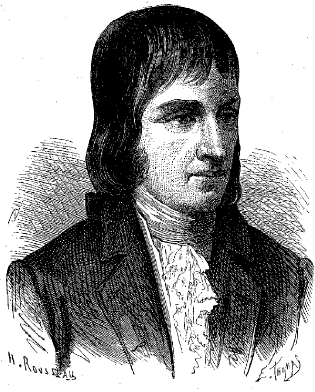
Philippe LeBon

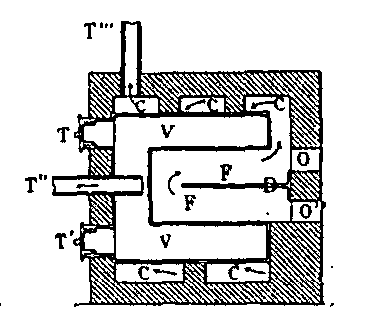
LeBon's thermolamp, from his patent (1799 and 1801)

Philippe LeBon was a French civil engineer working in the public engineering corps who became interested while at university in distillation as an industrial process for the manufacturing of materials such as tar and oil. He graduated from the engineering school in 1789, and was assigned to Angoulême. There, he investigated distillation, and became aware that the gas produced in the distillation of wood and coal could be useful for lighting, heating, and as an energy source in engines. He took out a patent for distillation processes in 1794, and continued his research, eventually designing a distillation oven known as the thermolamp. He applied for and received a patent for this invention in 1799, with an addition in 1801. He launched a marketing campaign in Paris in 1801 by printing a pamphlet and renting a house where he put on public demonstrations with his apparatus. His goal was to raise sufficient funds from investors to launch a company, but he failed to attract this sort of interest, either from the French state or from private sources. He was forced to abandon the project and return to the civil engineering corps. Although he was given a forest concession by the French government to experiment with the manufacture of tar from wood for naval use, he never succeed with the thermolamp, and died in uncertain circumstances in 1805.

Although the thermolamp received some interest in France, it was in Germany that interest was the greatest. A number of books and articles were written on the subject in the period 1802–1812. There were also thermolamps designed and built in Germany, the most important of which were by Zachaus Winzler, an Austrian chemist who ran a saltpetre factory in Blansko. Under the patronage of the aristocratic zu Salm family, he built a large one in Brno. He moved to Vienna to further his work. The thermolamp, however, was used primarily for making charcoal and not for the production of gases.

=== William Murdock and Boulton & Watt ===
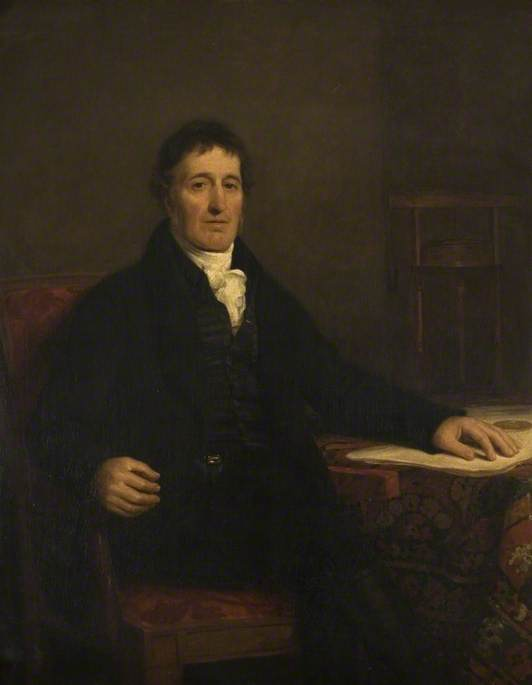
William Murdock

William Murdoch (sometimes Murdock) (1754–1839) was an engineer working for the firm of Boulton & Watt, when, while investigating distillation processes sometime in 1792–1794, he began using coal gas for illumination. He was living in Redruth in Cornwall at the time, and made some small scale experiments with lighting his own house with coal gas. He soon dropped the subject until 1798, when he moved to Birmingham to work at Boulton & Watt's home base of Soho. Boulton & Watt then instigated another small-scale series of experiments. With ongoing patent litigation and their main business of steam engines to attend to, the subject was dropped once again. Gregory Watt, James Watt's second son, while traveling in Europe saw Lebon's demonstrations and wrote a letter to his brother, James Watt Jr., informing him of this potential competitor. This prompted James Watt Jr. to begin a gaslight development program at Boulton & Watt that would scale up the technology and lead to the first commercial applications of gaslight.

After an initial installation at the Soho Foundry in 1803–1804, Boulton & Watt prepared an apparatus for the textile firm of Philips & Lee in Salford near Manchester in 1805–1806. This was to be their only major sale until late 1808. George Augustus Lee was a major motivating force behind the development of the apparatus. He had an avid interest in technology, and had introduced a series of technological innovations at the Salford Mill, such as iron frame construction and steam heating. He continued to encourage the development of gaslight technology at Boulton & Watt.

=== Winsor and the Gas Light and Coke Company ===
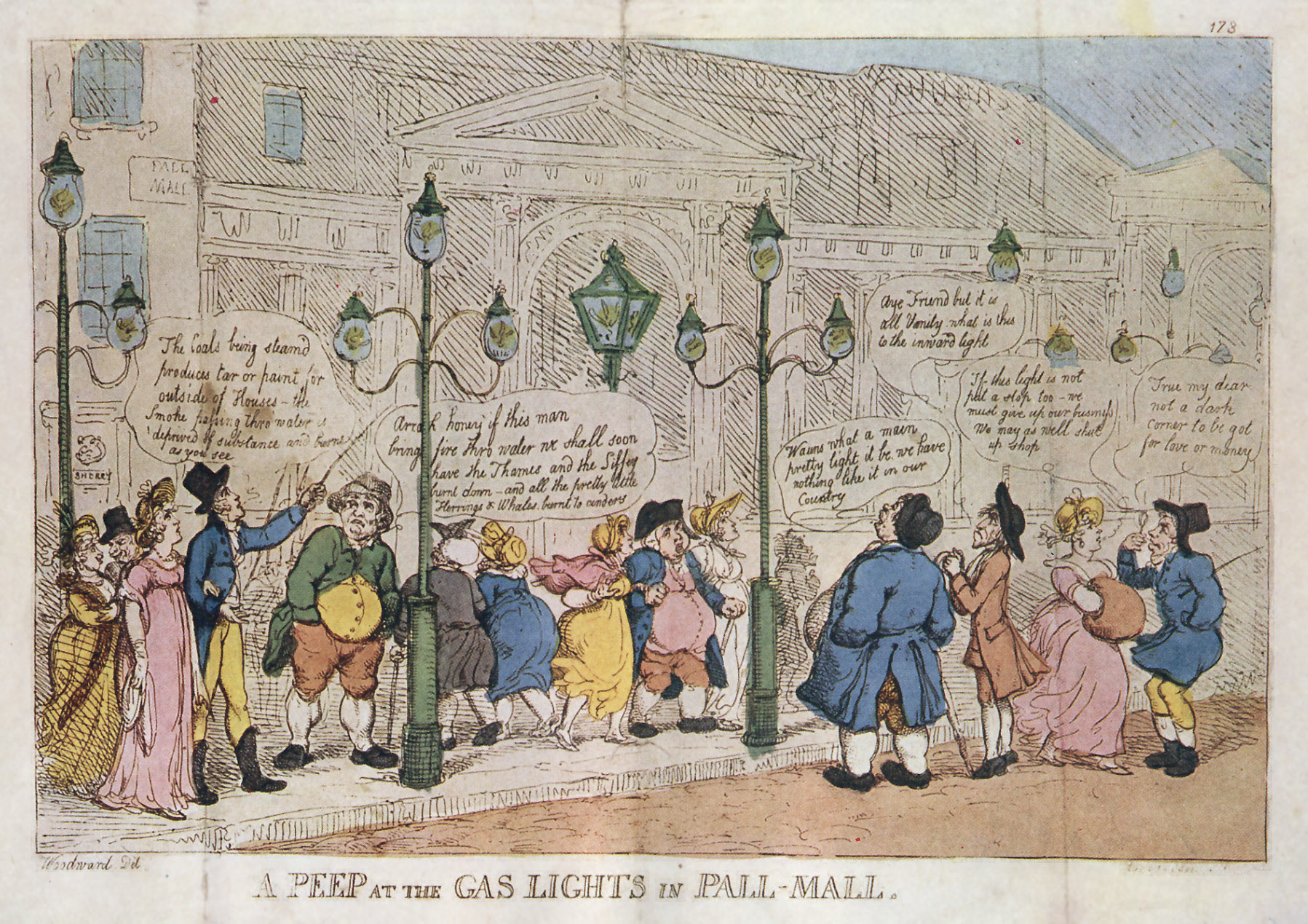
A Peep at the Gas-lights in Pall Mall: A contemporary caricature of Winsor's lighting of Pall Mall, by George Rowlandson (1809)

The first company to provide manufactured gas to consumer as a utility was the London-based Gas Light and Coke Company. It was founded through the efforts of a German émigré, Frederick Winsor, who had witnessed Lebon's demonstrations in Paris. He had tried unsuccessfully to purchase a thermolamp from Lebon, but remained taken with the technology, and decided to try his luck, first in his hometown of Brunswick, and then in London in 1804. Once in London, Winsor began an intense campaign to find investors for a new company that would manufacture gas apparatus and sell gas to consumers. He was successful in finding investors, but the legal form of the company was a more difficult problem. By the Bubble Act 1720, all joint-stock companies above a certain number of shareholders in England needed to receive a royal charter to incorporate, which meant that an act of Parliament was required.

Winsor waged his campaign intermittently to 1807, when the investors constituted a committee charged with obtaining an act of Parliament. They pursued this task over the next three years, encountering adversities en route, the most important of which was the resistance by Boulton & Watt in 1809. In that year, the committee made a serious attempt to get the House of Commons to pass a bill empowering the king to grant the charter, but Boulton & Watt felt their gaslight apparatus manufacturing business was threatened and mounted an opposition through their allies in Parliament. Although a parliamentary committee recommended approval, it was defeated on the third reading.

The following year, the committee tried again, succeeding with the acquiescence of Boulton & Watt because they renounced all powers to manufacture apparatus for sale. The resulting act of Parliament required that the company raise £100,000 before they could request a charter, a condition it took the next two years to fill. George III granted the charter in 1812.

== Manufactured gas 1812–1825 ==
=== Manufactured gas in England ===
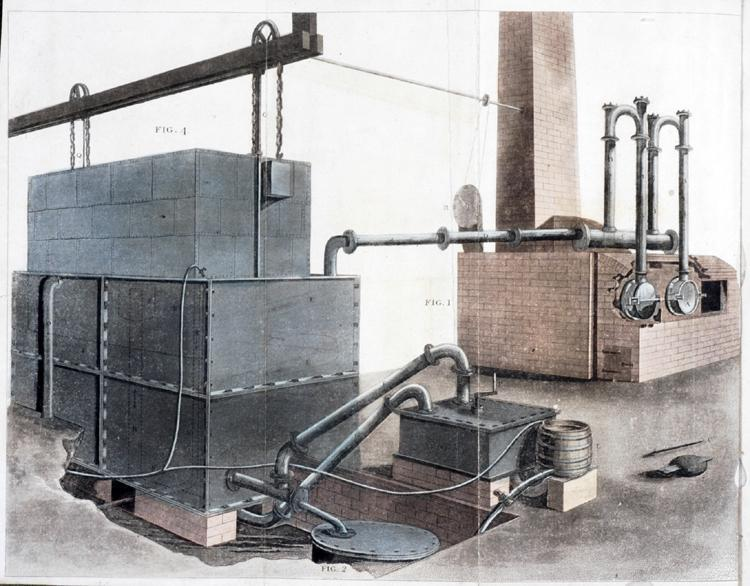
A coloured plate of a gas plant from Frederick Accum's A Practical Treatise on Gas-light (1815)

From 1812 to approximately 1825, manufactured gas was predominantly an English technology. A number of new gas utilities were founded to serve London and other cities in the UK after 1812. Liverpool, Exeter, and Preston were the first in 1816. Others soon followed; by 1821, no town with population over 50,000 was without gaslight. Five years later, there were only two towns over 10,000 that were without gaslight. In London, the growth of gaslight was rapid. New companies were founded within a few years of the Gas Light and Coke Company, and a period of intense competition followed as companies competed for consumers on the boundaries of their respective zones of operations. Frederick Accum, in the various editions of his book on gaslight, gives a good sense of how rapidly the technology spread in the capital. In 1815, he wrote that there were 4,000 lamps in the city, served by 26 miles (42 km) of mains. In 1819, he raised his estimate to 51,000 lamps and 288 miles (463 km) of mains. Likewise, there were only two gasworks in London in 1814, and by 1822, there were seven and by 1829, there were 200 companies. The government did not regulate the industry as a whole until 1816, when an act of Parliament created the post of inspector for gasworks, the first holder of which was Sir William Congreve. Even then, no laws were passed regulating the entire industry until an act of Parliament was passed in 1847, although a bill was proposed in 1822, which failed due to opposition from gas companies. The charters approved by Parliament did, however, contain various regulations such as how the companies could break up the pavement, etc.

=== Manufactured gas in Europe and North America ===
France's first gas company was also promoted by Frederick Winsor after he had to flee England in 1814 due to unpaid debts. He tried to found another gas company in Paris, but it failed in 1819. The government was also interested in promoting the industry, and in 1817 commissioned Chabrol de Volvic to study the technology and build a prototype plant, also in Paris. The plant provided gas for lighting the hôpital Saint Louis and the experiment was judged successful. King Louis XVIII then decided to give further impulse to the development of the French industry by sending people to England to study the situation there, and to install gaslight at a number of prestigious buildings, such as the Paris Opera building, the national library, etc. A public company was created for this purpose in 1818. Private companies soon followed, and by 1822, when the government moved to regulate the industry, four were operating in the capital. The regulations passed then prevented the companies from competing, and Paris was effectively divided between the various companies operating as monopolies in their own zones.

Gaslight spread to other European countries. In 1817, a company was founded in Brussels by P. J. Meeus-Van der Maelen, and began operating the following year. By 1822, there were companies in Amsterdam and Rotterdam using English technology. In Germany, gaslight was used on a small scale from 1816 onwards, but the first gaslight utility was founded by English engineers and capital. In 1824, the Imperial Continental Gas Association was founded in London to establish gas utilities in other countries. Sir William Congreve, 2nd Baronet, one if its leaders, signed an agreement with the government in Hanover, and the gas lamps were used on streets for the first time in 1826.

Gaslight was first introduced to the US in 1816 in Baltimore by Rembrandt and Rubens Peale, who lit their museum with gaslight, which they had seen on a trip to Europe. The brothers convinced a group of wealthy people to back them in a larger enterprise. The local government passed a law allowing the Peales and their associates to lay mains and light the streets. A company was incorporated for this purpose in 1817. After some difficulties with the apparatus and financial problems, the company hired an English engineer with experience in gaslight. It began to flourish, and by the 1830s, the company was supplying gas to 3000 domestic customers and 100 street lamps. Companies in other cities followed, the second being Boston Gas Light in 1822 and New York Gas Light Company in 1825. A gas works was built in Philadelphia in 1835.

=== Manufactured gas in Australia ===
The Australian Gas Light Company, established in 1837, opened the first gasworks in Australia, at Millers Point in Sydney in 1841.

== Law and safety ==
Gas lighting was one of the most debated technologies of the first industrial revolution. In Paris, as early as 1823, controversy forced the government to devise safety standards. The residues produced from distilled coal were often either drained into rivers or stored in basins which polluted (and still pollute) the soil. One early exception was the Edinburgh Gas Works where, from 1822, the residues were carted and later piped to the Bonnington Chemical Works and processed into valuable products.

Case law in the UK and the US clearly held though, the construction and operation of a gas-works was not the creation of a public nuisance or malum in se, due to the reputation of gas-works as highly undesirable neighbors, and the noxious pollution known to issue from such, especially in the early days of manufactured gas, gas-works were on extremely short notice from the courts that (detectable) contamination outside of their grounds – especially in residential districts – would be severely frowned upon. Indeed, many actions for the abatement of nuisances brought before the courts did result in unfavorable verdicts for gas manufacturers – in one study on early environmental law, actions for nuisance involving gas-works resulted in findings for the plaintiffs 80% of the time, compared with an overall plaintiff victory rate of 28.5% in industrial nuisance cases.

Injunctions both preliminary and permanent could and were often issued in cases involving gas works. For example, the ill reputation of gas-works became so well known that in City of Cleveland vs. Citizens' Gas Light Co., 20 N. J. Eq. 201, a court went so far as to enjoin a future gas-works not yet even built – preventing it from causing annoying and offensive vapours and odors in the first place. The injunction not only regulated the gas manufacturing process – forbidding the use of lime purification – but also provided that if nuisances of any sort were to issue from the works – a permanent injunction forbidding the production of gas would issue from the court. Indeed, as the Master of the Rolls, Lord Langdale, once remarked in his opinion in Haines v. Taylor, 10 Beavan 80, that I have been rather astonished to hear the effects of gas works treated as nothing...every man, in these days, must have sufficient experience, to enable him to come to the conclusion, that, whether a nuisance or not, a gas manufactory is a very disagreeable thing. Nobody can doubt that the volatile products which arise from the distillation of coal are extremely offensive. It is quite contrary to common experience to say they are not so...every man knows it. However, as time went by, gas-works began to be seen as more as a double-edged sword – and eventually as a positive good, as former nuisances were abated by technological improvements, and the full benefits of gas became clear. There were several major impetuses that drove this phenomenon:

- regulation of pollution from gas-works (in the case of the UK, with the passage of the Gasworks Clauses Act 1847), which increased the cost of pollution, previously being near zero, leading to the development of technologies that abated the ongoing pollution nuisances (in many cases, turning discarded former pollutants into profitable by-products);
- the rise of the "smoke nuisance" in the 1850s, brought about by the domestic and commercial use of coal, in many cities and metropolises; direct combustion of coal being a particularly notorious source of pollution; which the widespread use of gas could abate, especially with the commencement of using gas for purposes other than illuminating during the 1870s; for cooking, for the heating of dwelling-houses, for making domestic hot water, for raising steam, for industrial and chemical purposes, and for stationary internal combustion engine-driving purposes – which were previously met by employing coal;
- the development of high-pressure gas mains, and compressors (1900s); these were capable of efficiently transporting gas over long distances, allowing one manufactured gas plant to supply a relatively large area – leading to the concentration of gas-manufacturing operations, instead of their geographic distribution; this resulted in gas-works being able to be located away from residential and commercial districts, where their presence could result in discomfort and concern for the inhabitants thereof;

Both the era of consolidation of gas-works through high-pressure distribution systems (1900s–1930s) and the end of the era of manufactured gas (1955–1975) saw gas-works being shut down due to redundancies. What brought about the end of manufactured gas was that pipelines began to be built to bring natural gas directly from the well to gas distribution systems. Natural gas was superior to the manufactured gas of that time, being cheaper – extracted from wells rather than manufactured in a gas-works – more user friendly – coming from the well requiring little, if any, purification – and safer – due to the lack of carbon monoxide in the distributed product. Upon being shut down, few former manufactured gas plant sites were brought to an acceptable level of environmental cleanliness to allow for their re-use, at least by contemporary standards. In fact, many were literally abandoned in place, with process wastes left in situ, and never adequately disposed of. In the United States, an EPA report from 1999 indicates that there are 3,000 to 5,000 former manufactured gas plant sites around the country.

As the wastes produced by former manufactured gas plants were persistent in nature, they often (as of 2009) still contaminate the site of former manufactured gas plants: the waste causing the most concern today is primarily coal tar (mixed long-chain aromatic and aliphatic hydrocarbons, a byproduct of coal carbonization), while "blue billy" (a noxious byproduct of lime purification contaminated with cyanides) as well as other lime and coal tar residues are regarded as lesser, though significant environmental hazards. Some former manufactured gas plants are owned by gas utilities today, often in an effort to prevent contaminated land from falling into public use, and inadvertently causing the release of the wastes therein contained. Others have fallen into public use, and without proper reclamation, have caused – often severe – health hazards for their users. When and where necessary, former manufactured gas plants are subject to environmental remediation laws, and can be subject to legally mandated cleanups.

== Appliances and machinery of the historic gasworks ==
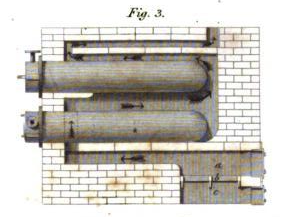
Horizontal view of a retort and furnace (1819)

The basic design of gaslight apparatus was established by Boulton & Watt and Samuel Clegg in the period 1805–1812. Further improvements were made at the Gas Light and Coke Company, as well as by the growing number of gas engineers such as John Malam and Thomas Peckston after 1812. Boulton & Watt contributed the basic design of the retort, condenser, and gasometer, while Clegg improved the gasometer and introduced lime purification and the hydraulic main, another purifier.

=== Retort bench ===
The retort bench was the construction in which the retorts were located for the carbonization (synonymous with pyrolysis) of the coal feedstock and the evolution of coal gas. Over the years of manufactured gas production, advances were made that turned the retort-bench from little more than coal-containing iron vessels over an open fire to a massive, highly efficient, partially automated, industrial-scale, capital-intensive plant for the carbonization of large amounts of coal. Several retort benches were usually located in a single "retort house", which there was at least one of in every gas works.

Initially, retort benches were of many different configurations due to the lack of long use and scientific and practical understanding of the carbonization of coal. Some early retorts were little more than iron vessels filled with coal and thrust upon a coal fire with pipes attached to their top ends. Though practical for the earliest gas works, this quickly changed once the early gas-works served more than a few customers. As the size of such vessels grew – the need became apparent for efficiency in refilling retorts – and it was apparent that filling one-ended vertical retorts was easy; removing the coke and residues from them after the carbonization of coal was far more difficult. Hence, gas retorts transitioned from vertical vessels to horizontal tubular vessels.

Retorts were usually made of cast iron during the early days. Early gas engineers experimented extensively with the best shape, size, and setting. No one form of retort dominated, and many different cross-sections remained in use. After the 1850s, retorts generally became made of fire clay due to greater heat retention, greater durability, and other positive qualities. Cast-iron retorts were used in small gas works, due to their compatibility with the demands there, with the cast-iron retort's lower cost, ability to heat quickly to meet transient demand, and "plug and play" replacement capabilities. This outweighed the disadvantages of shorter life, lower temperature margins, and lack of ability to be manufactured in non-cylindrical shapes. Also, general gas-works practice following the switch to fire-clay retorts favored retorts that were shaped like a "D" turned 90 degrees to the left, sometimes with a slightly pitched bottom section.

With the introduction of the fire-clay retort, higher heats could be held in the retort benches, leading to faster and more complete carbonization of the coal. As higher heats became possible, advanced methods of retort bench firing were introduced, catalyzed by the development of the open hearth furnace by Siemens, circa 1855–1870, leading to a revolution in gas-works efficiency.

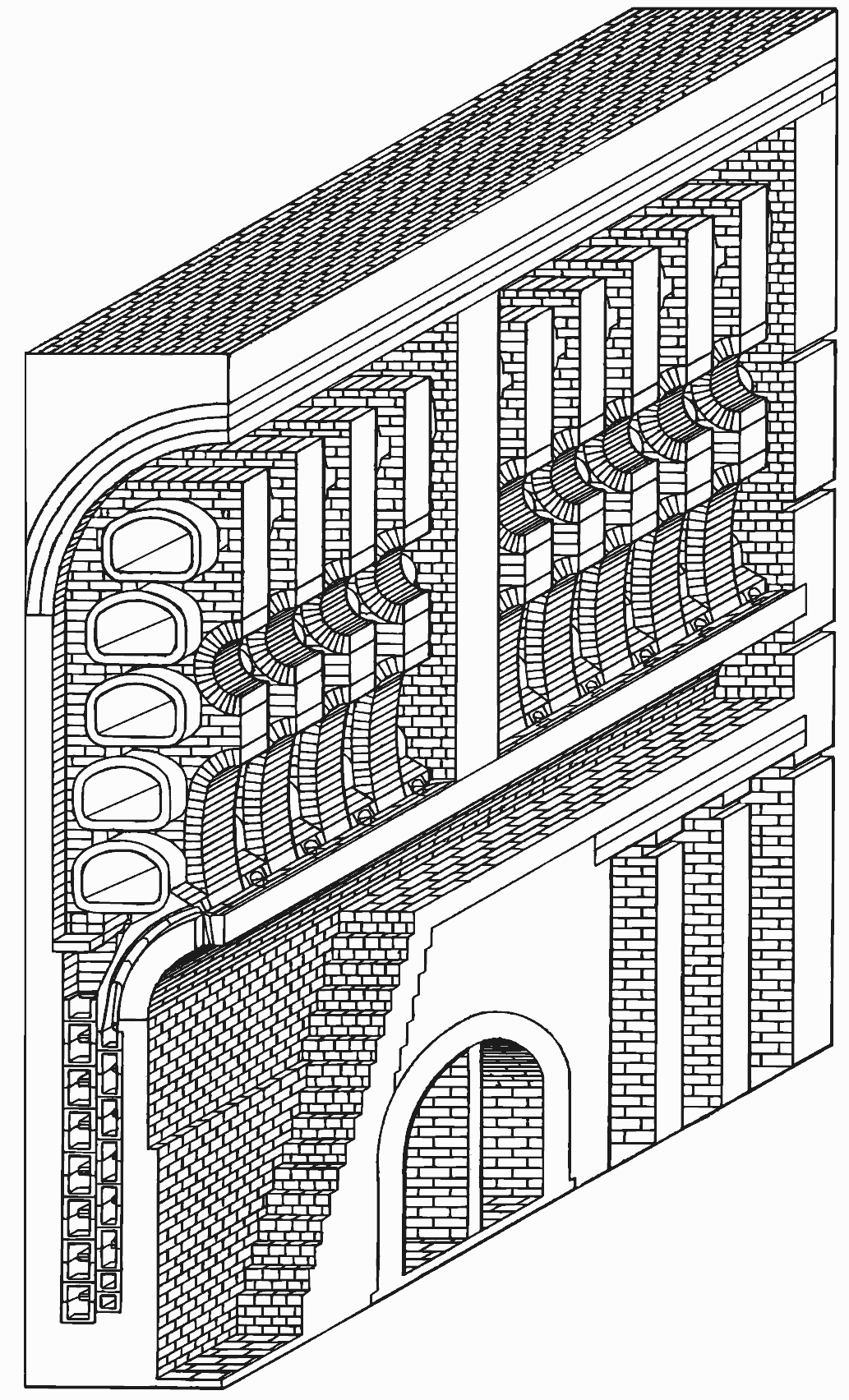
Isometric view of a regenerative retort bench (1921)

Specifically, the two major advances were:

- The introduction of the "indirectly fired" retort bench. The early "directly fired" retort bench consisted of retorts suspended over a coke fire, which heated the retorts and drove the carbonization of coal within to coke, and the evolution of gas. The introduction of indirect firing changed this. Instead of the retorts being heated directly by fire – the fire was placed a ways below and to one side of the retorts, brought to a very high heat, while the air supply was reduced and a small amount of steam introduced. Instead of evolving large quantities of heat to directly heat the retorts, the fire now evolved heated gasses – specifically carbon monoxide and due to the steam, a small amount of hydrogen as well, which are both highly combustible. These gasses rise from the fire into a channel which brings them to the "tuyeres" – small holes similar to "nostrils", located adjacent to the retorts, which shoot the "furnace-gasses" out of them. Adjacent "tuyeres" emit a large amount of "secondary air", which is preheated air, that, upon mixing with the furnace gasses, causes them to ignite and burst into flame and bathe the exterior of the retorts in heat.
- The introduction of heat recuperation for the preheating of the air of primary and secondary combustion. By causing the exhaust of the retort-bench to pass through a maze of refractory brickwork, substantial quantities of heat can be extracted from it. On the other side of the exhaust channels are channels for the passage of the air of combustion. The bricks thus transfer the heat of the exhaust to the air of combustion, preheating it. This provides for a much greater degree of thermal efficiency in the retort-bench, causing it to be able to use far less coke, since air that is preheated by waste heat is already hot when it enters the fire to be burnt, or the "tuyere" to fuel secondary combustion.

These two advances turned the old, "directly fired" retort bench into the advanced, "indirectly fired", "regenerative" or "generative" retort bench, and lead coke usage within the retort benches (in the larger works) to drop from upwards of 40% of the coke made by the retorts to factors as low as 15% of the coke made by the retorts, leading to an improvement in efficiency of an order of magnitude. These improvements imparted an additional capital cost to the retort bench, which caused them to be slowly incorporated in the smaller gas-works, if they were incorporated at all.

Further increases in efficiency and safety were seen with the introduction of the "through" retort, which had a door at front and rear. This provided for greater efficiency and safety in loading and unloading the retorts, which was a labor-intensive and often dangerous process. Coal could now be pushed out of the retort – rather than pulled out of the retort. One interesting modification of the "through" retort was the "inclined" retort – coming into its heyday in the 1880s – a retort set on a moderate incline, where coal was poured in at one end, and the retort sealed; following pyrolysis, the bottom was opened and the coke poured out by gravity. This was adopted in some gas-works, but the savings in labor were often offset by the uneven distribution and pyrolysis of the coal as well as clumping problems leading to failure of the coal to pour out of the bottom following pyrolysis that were exacerbated in certain coal types. As such, inclined retorts were rendered obsolescent by later advances, including the retort-handling machine and the vertical retort system.

Several advanced retort-house appliances were introduced for improved efficiency and convenience. The compressed-air or steam-driven clinkering pick was found to be especially useful in removing clinker from the primary combustion area of the indirectly fired benches – previously clinkering was an arduous and time-consuming process that used large amounts of retort house labor. Another class of appliances introduced were apparatuses – and ultimately, machines – for retort loading and unloading. Retorts were generally loaded by using an elongated scoop, into which the coal was loaded – a gang of men would then lift the scoop and ram it into the retort. The coal would then be raked by the men into a layer of even thickness and the retort sealed. Gas production would then ensue – and from 8 – 12 hours later, the retort would be opened, and the coal would be either pulled (in the case of "stop-ended" retorts) or pushed (in the case of "through" retorts) out of the retort. Thus, the retort house had heavy manpower requirements – as many men were often required to bear the coal-containing scoop and load the retort.

=== Other gasworks facilities ===
From the retort, the gas would first pass through a tar/water "trap" (similar to a trap in plumbing) called a hydraulic main, where a considerable fraction of coal tar was given up and the gas was significantly cooled. Then, it would pass through the main out of the retort house into an atmospheric or water-cooled condenser, where it would be cooled to the temperature of the atmosphere or the water used. At this point, it enters the exhauster house and passes through an "exhauster", an air pump which maintains the hydraulic mains and, consequently, the retorts at a negative pressure (with a zero pressure being atmospheric). It would then be washed in a "washer" by bubbling it through water, to extract any remaining tars. After this, it would enter a purifier. The gas would then be ready for distribution, and pass into a gasholder for storage.

==== Hydraulic main ====
Cross section of a hydraulic main (1909)

Within each retort-house, the retort benches would be lined up next to one another in a long row. Each retort had a loading and unloading door. Affixed to each door was an ascension pipe, to carry off the gas as it was evolved from the coal within. These pipes would rise to the top of the bench where they would terminate in an inverted "U" with the leg of the "U" disappearing into a long, trough-shaped structure (with a covered top) made of cast iron called a hydraulic main that was placed atop the row of benches near their front edge. It ran continuously along the row of benches within the retort house, and each ascension pipe from each retort descended into it.

The hydraulic main had a level of a liquid mixture of (initially) water, but, following use, also coal tar, and ammoniacal liquor. Each retort ascension pipe dropped under the water level by at least a small amount, perhaps by an inch, but often considerably more in the earlier days of gas manufacture. The gas evolved from each retort would thus bubble through the liquid and emerge from it into the void above the liquid, where it would mix with the gas evolved from the other retorts and be drawn off through the foul main to the condenser.

There were two purposes to the liquid seal: first, to draw off some of the tar and liquor, as the gas from the retort was laden with tar, and the hydraulic main could rid the gas of it, to a certain degree; further tar removal would take place in the condenser, washer/scrubber, and the tar extractor. Still, there would be less tar to deal with later. Second, the liquid seal also provided defense against air being drawn into the hydraulic main: if the main had no liquid within, and a retort was left open with the pipe not shut off, and air were to combine with the gas, the main could explode, along with nearby benches.

However, after the early years of gas, research proved that a very deep, excessive seal on the hydraulic main threw a backpressure upon all the retorts as the coal within was gasifying, and this had deleterious consequences; carbon would likely deposit onto the insides of retorts and ascension pipes; and the bottom layer of tar with which the gas would have to travel through in a deeply sealed main robbed the gas of some of its illuminating value. As such, after the 1860s, hydraulic mains were run at around 1 inch of seal, and no more.

Later retort systems (many types of vertical retorts, especially ones in continuous operation) which had other anti-oxygen safeguards, such as check valves, etc., as well as larger retorts, often omitted the hydraulic main entirely and went straight to the condensers – as other apparatus and buildings could be used for tar extraction, the main was unnecessary for these systems.

==== Condenser ====
Condensers were either air-cooled or water-cooled.

===== Air-cooled condensers =====
Air cooled condensers were often made up from odd lengths of pipe and connections. The main varieties in common use were classified as follows:

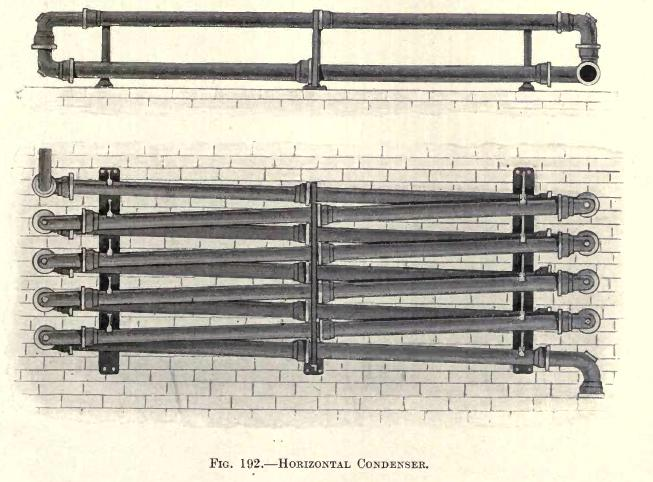
Horizontal Air Cooled Condenser

(a) Horizontal types

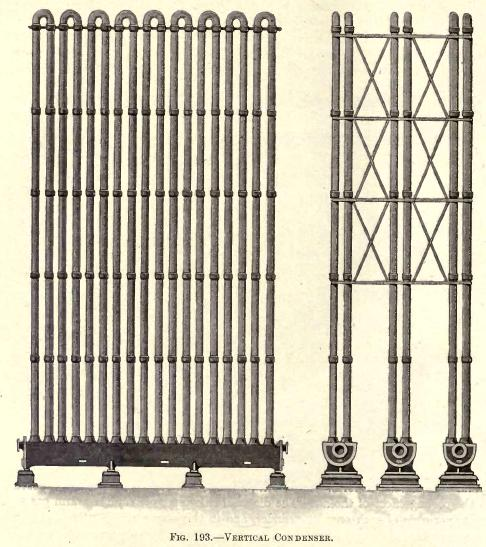
Vertical Air Cooled Condenser

(b) Vertical types

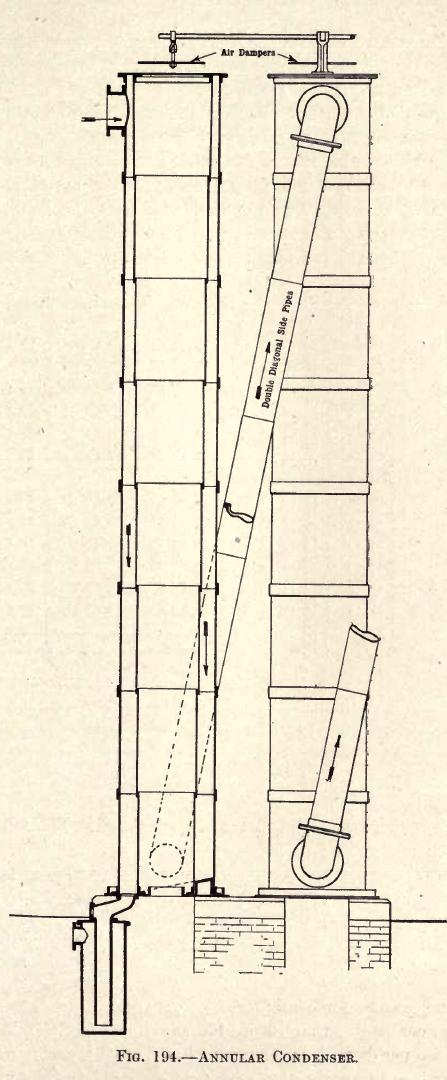
Annular Air Cooled Condenser

(c) Annular types

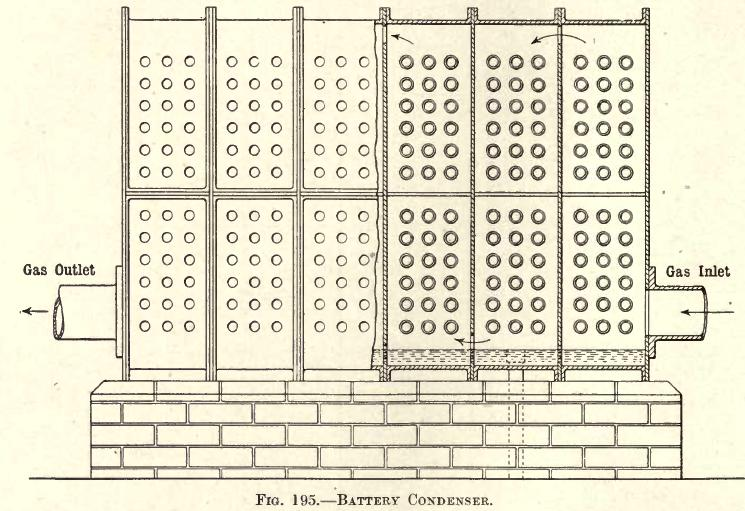
Battery Air Cooled Condenser

(d) The battery condenser.

The horizontal condenser was an extended foul main with the pipe in a zigzag pattern from end to end of one of the retort-house walls. Flange connections were essential as blockages from naphthalene or pitchy deposits were likely to occur. The condensed liquids flowed down the sloping pipes in the same direction as the gas. As long as gas flow was slow, this was an effective method for the removal of naphthalene. Vertical air condensers had gas and tar outlets.

The annular atmospheric condenser was easier to control with respect to cooling rates. The gas in the tall vertical cylinders was annular in form and allowed an inside and outside surface to be exposed to cooling air. The diagonal side pipes conveyed the warm gas to the upper ends of each annular cylinder. Butterfly valves or dampers were fitted to the top of each vertical air pipe, so that the amount of cooling could be regulated.

The battery condenser was a long and narrow box divided internally by baffle-plates which cause the gas to take a circuitous course. The width of the box was usually about 2 feet, and small tubes passed from side to side form the chief cooling surface. The ends of these tubes were left open to allow air to pass through. The obstruction caused by the tubes played a role in breaking up and throwing down the tars suspended in the gas.

Typically, plants using cast-iron mains and apparatus allowed 5 square feet of superficial area per 1,000 cubic feet of gas made per day. This could be slightly reduced when wrought iron or mild steel was used.

===== Water-cooled condensers =====
Water-cooled condensers were mainly constructed from riveted mild steel plates (which form the outer shell) and steel or wrought-iron tubes. There were two distinct types used:

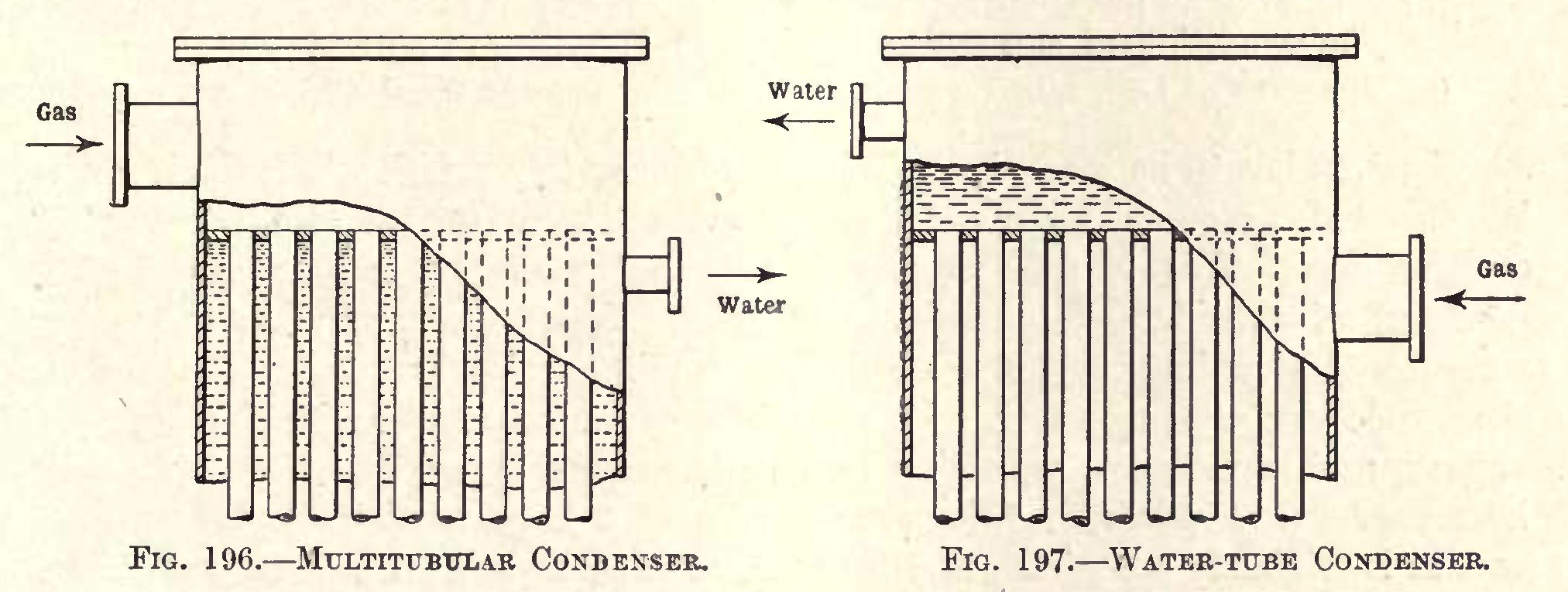
Water Cooled Tubular Condensers

(a) Multitubular condensers.

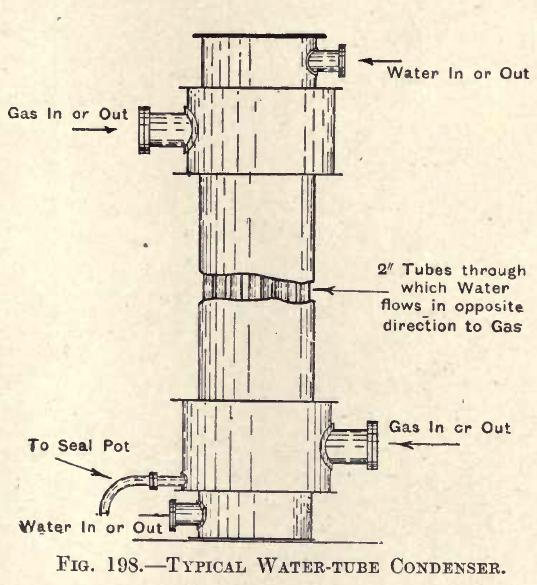
Water Tube Condenser

(b) Water-tube condensers.

Unless the cooling water was exceptionally clean, the water-tube condenser was preferred. The major difference between the multitubular and water-tube condenser was that in the former the water passed outside and around the tubes which carry the hot gas, and in the latter type, the opposite was the case. Thus when only muddy water pumped from rivers or canals was available; the water-tube condenser was used. When the incoming gas was particularly dirty and contained an undesirable quantity of heavy tar, the outer chamber was liable to obstruction from this cause.

The hot gas was saturated with water vapor and accounted for the largest portion of the total work of condensation. Water vapor has to lose large quantities of heat, as did any liquefiable hydrocarbon. Of the total work of condensation, 87% was accounted for in removing water vapor and the remainder was used to cool permanent gases and to condensing liquefiable hydrocarbon.

As extremely finely divided particles were also suspended in the gas, it was impossible to separate the particulate matter solely by a reduction of vapor pressure. The gas underwent processes to remove all traces of solid or liquid matter before it reached the wet purification plant. Centrifugal separators, such as the Colman Cyclone apparatus were utilized for this process in some plants.

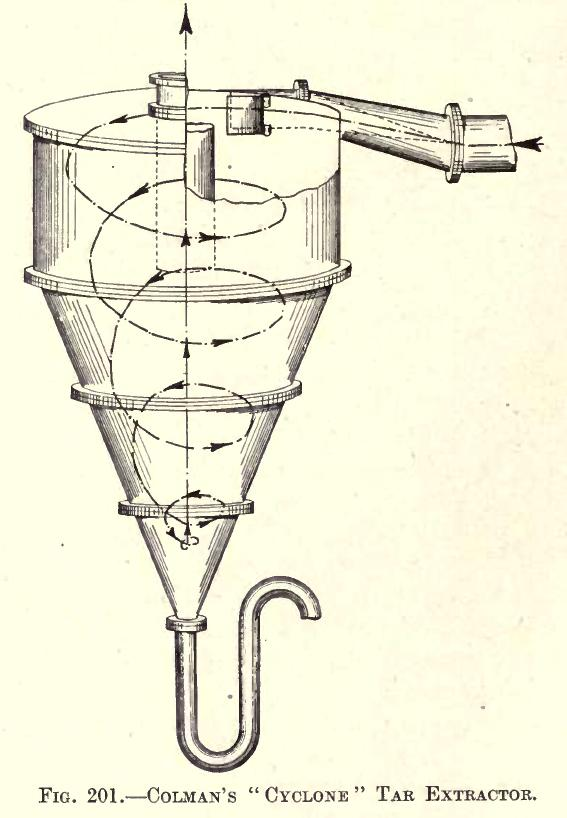
Colman "Cyclone" Separator

The hydrocarbon condensates removed in the order heavy tars, medium tars and finally light tars and oil fog. About 60-65% of the tars would be deposited in the hydraulic main. Most of this tar was heavy tars. The medium tars condensed out during the passage of the products between the hydraulic and the condenser. The lighter tars oil fog would travel considerably further.

In general, the temperature of the gas in the hydraulic main varies between 140-160^{o} F. The constituents most liable to be lost were benzene, toluene, and, to some extent, xylene, which had an important effect on the ultimate illuminating power of the gas. Tars were detrimental for the illuminating power and were isolated from the gas as rapidly as possible.

==== Exhauster ====
Maintained hydraulic main and condenser at negative pressure.

There were several types of exhausters:

- The steam ejector/aspirator type exhauster used a substantial steam jet/venturi to maintain the negative pressure in the hydraulic main and condenser. This type of exhauster was mechanically simple, had no moving parts, and thus, had virtually no potential to fail. However, it consumed a comparatively large amount of steam. Often used as a backup exhauster; in this role it continued as a reliable backup until the end of the age of manufactured gas.
- Reciprocating exhausters of various types. Steam engine-driven exhauster used cylinder pump to pump gas. Relatively reliable, but inefficient, using large quantities of steam, but less than the ejector type exhauster. Used in the early days of exhausters, but quickly obsoleted.
- Blower-type exhauster
- Turboexhauster

==== The washer–scrubber ====
Final extractions of minor deleterious fractions.

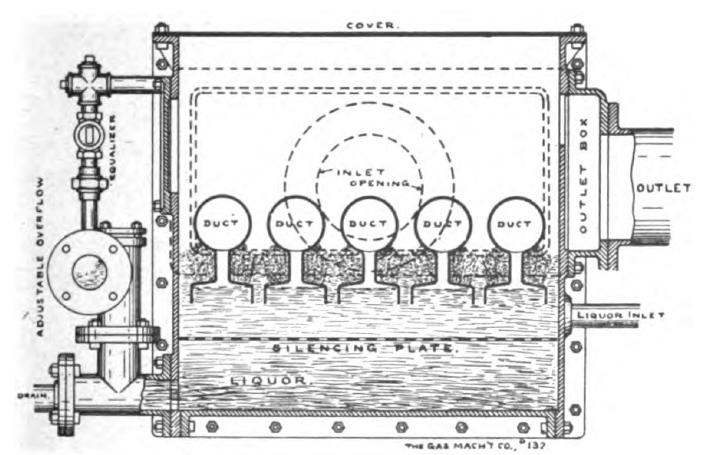
Bubbling Washer for Ammonia Removal

Scrubbers which utilized water were designed in the 25 years after the foundation of the industry. It was discovered that the removal of ammonia from the gas depended upon the way in which the gas to be purified was contacted by water. This was found to be best performed by the Tower Scrubber. This scrubber consisted of a tall cylindrical vessel, which contained trays or bricks which were supported on grids. The water, or weak gas liquor, trickled over these trays, thereby keeping the exposed surfaces thoroughly wetted. The gas to be purified was run through the tower to be contacted with the liquid. In 1846 George Lowe patented a device with revolving perforated pipes for supplying water or purifying liquor. At a later date, the Rotary Washer Scrubber was introduced by Paddon, who used it at Brighton about 1870. This prototype machine was followed by others of improved construction; notably by Kirkham, Hulett, and Chandler, who introduced the well-known Standard Washer Scrubber, Holmes, of Huddersfield, and others. The Tower Scrubber and the Rotary Washer Scrubber made it possible to completely remove ammonia from the gas.

==== Purifier ====
Coal gas coming directly from the bench was a noxious soup of chemicals, and removal of the most deleterious fractions was important, for improving the quality of the gas, for preventing damage to equipment or premises, and for recovering revenues from the sale of the extracted chemicals. Several offensive fractions being present in a distributed gas might lead to problems – Tar in the distributed gas might gum up the pipes (and could be sold for a good price), ammoniacal vapours in the gas might lead to corrosion problems (and the extracted ammonium sulfate was a decent fertilizer), naphthalene vapours in the gas might stop up the gas-mains, and even carbon dioxide in the gas was known to decrease illumination; thus various facilities within the gas-works were tasked with the removal of these deleterious effluents. But these do not compare to the most hazardous contaminant in the raw coal gas: the sulfuret of hydrogen (hydrogen sulfide, H_{2}S). This was regarded as unacceptable for several reasons:

1. The gas would smell of rotten eggs when burnt;
2. The gas-works and adjacent district would smell of rotten eggs when the gas-works was producing gas;
3. The gas, upon burning, would form sulfur dioxide, which would be quickly oxidized to sulfur trioxide, and subsequently would react with the water vapor produced by combustion to form sulfuric acid vapour. In a dwelling-house, this could lead to the formation of irritating, poisonous and corrosive atmospheres where and when burnt.
4. Manufactured gas was originally distributed to affluent consumers, who known to possess silver goods of varying sorts. If exposed to a sulfurous atmosphere, silver tarnishes, and a sulfurous atmosphere would be present in any house lit with sulfuretted gas.

As such, the removal of the sulfuret of hydrogen was given the highest level of priority in the gas-works. A special facility existed to extract the sulfuret of hydrogen – known as the purifier. The purifier was the most important facility in the gas-works, if the retort-bench itself is not included.

Originally, purifiers were simple tanks of lime-water, also known as cream or milk of lime, where the raw gas from the retort bench was bubbled through to remove the sulfuret of hydrogen. This original process of purification was known as the "wet lime" process. The lime residue left over from the "wet lime" process was one of the first true "toxic wastes", a material called "blue billy". Originally, the waste of the purifier house was flushed into a nearby body of water, such as a river or a canal. However, after fish kills, the nauseating way it made the rivers stink, and the truly horrendous stench caused by exposure of residuals if the river was running low, the public clamoured for better means of disposal. Thus it was piled into heaps for disposal. Some enterprising gas entrepreneurs tried to sell it as a weed-killer, but most people wanted nothing to do with it, and generally, it was regarded as waste which was both smelly and poisonous, and gas-works could do little with, except bury. But this was not the end of the "blue billy", for after burying it, rain would often fall upon its burial site, and leach the poison and stench from the buried waste, which could drain into fields or streams. Following countless fiascoes with "blue billy" contaminating the environment, a furious public, aided by courts, juries, judges, and masters in chancery, were often very willing to demand that the gas-works seek other methods of purification – and even pay for the damages caused by their old methods of purification.

This led to the development of the "dry lime" purification process, which was less effective than the "wet lime" process, but had less toxic consequences. Still, it was quite noxious. Slaked lime (calcium hydroxide) was placed in thick layers on trays which were then inserted into a square or cylinder-shaped purifier tower which gas was then passed through, from the bottom to the top. After the charge of slaked lime had lost most of its absorption effectiveness, the purifier was then shut off from the flow of gas, and either was opened, or air was piped in. Immediately, the sulfur-impregnated slaked lime would react with the air to liberate large concentrations of sulfuretted hydrogen, which would then billow out of the purifier house, and make the gas-works, and the district, stink of sulfuretted hydrogen. Though toxic in sufficient concentrations or long exposures, the sulfuret was generally just nauseating for short exposures at moderate concentrations, and was merely a health hazard (as compared to the outright danger of "blue billy") for the gas-works employees and the neighbors of the gas-works. The sulfuretted lime was not toxic, but not greatly wanted, slightly stinking of the odor of the sulfuret, and was spread as a low grade fertilizer, being impregnated with ammonia to some degree. The outrageous stinks from many gas-works led many citizens to regard them as public nuisances, and attracted the eye of regulators, neighbors, and courts.

The "gas nuisance" was finally solved by the "iron ore" process. Enterprising gas-works engineers discovered that bog iron ore could be used to remove the sulfuretted hydrogen from the gas, and not only could it be used for such, but it could be used in the purifier, exposed to the air, whence it would be rejuvenated, without emitting noxious sulfuretted hydrogen gas, the sulfur being retained in the iron ore. Then it could be reinserted into the purifier, and reused and rejuvenated multiple times, until it was thoroughly embedded with sulfur. It could then be sold to the sulfuric acid works for a small profit. Lime was sometimes still used after the iron ore had thoroughly removed the sulfuret of hydrogen, to remove carbonic acid (carbon dioxide, CO_{2}), the bisulfuret of carbon (carbon disulfide, CS_{2}), and any ammonia still aeroform after its travels through the works. But it was not made noxious as before, and usually could fetch a decent rate as fertilizer when impregnated with ammonia. This finally solved the greatest pollution nuisances of the gas-works, but still lesser problems remained – not any that the purifier house could solve, though.

Purifier designs also went through different stages throughout the years.

==== The gasholder ====
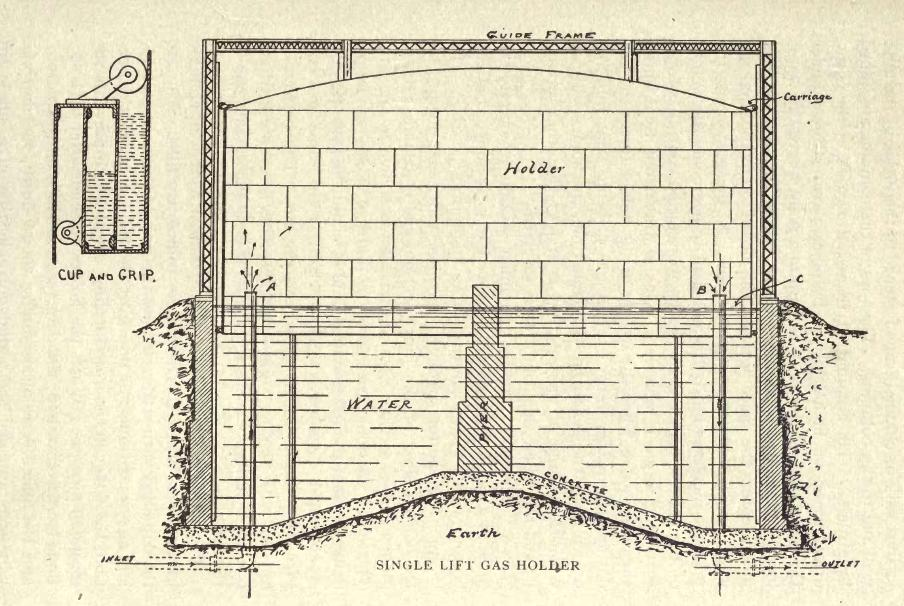
Single Lift Gasholder

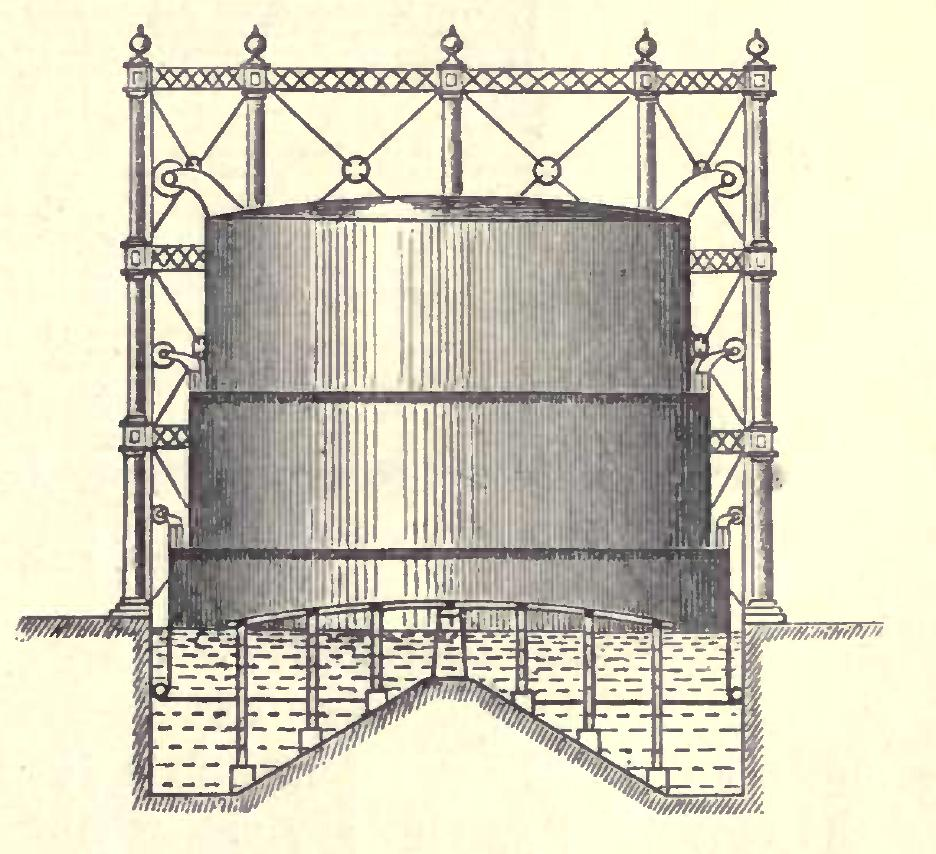
Telescoping Gasholder

Gasholders were constructed of a variety of materials, brick, stone, concrete, steel, or wrought iron. The holder or floating vessel is the storage reservoir for the gas, and it serves the purpose of equalizing the distribution of the gas under pressure, and ensures a continuity of supply, while gas remains in the holder. They are cylindrical like an inverted beaker and work up and down in the tank. In order to maintain a true vertical position, the vessel has rollers which work on guide-rails attached to the tank sides and to the columns surrounding the holder.

Gasholders may be either single or telescopic in two or more lifts. When it is made in the telescopic form, its capacity could be increased to as much as four times the capacity of the single-lift holder for equal dimensions of tank. The telescopic versions were found to be useful as they conserved ground space and capital.

==== Minor and incidental coal gas-works facilities ====
The gasworks had numerous small appurtenances and facilities to aid with diverse gas management tasks or auxiliary services.

===== Boilers =====
As the years went by, boilers (for the raising of steam) became extremely common in most gas-works above those small in size; the smaller works often used gas-powered internal combustion engines to do some of the tasks that steam performed in larger workings.

Steam was in use in many areas of the gasworks, including: For the operation of the exhauster; For scouring of pyrolysis char and slag from the retorts and for clinkering the producer of the bench; For the operation of engines used for conveying, compressing air, charging hydraulics, or the driving of dynamos or generators producing electric current; To be injected under the grate of the producer in the indirectly fired bench, so as to prevent the formation of clinker, and to aid in the water-gas shift reaction, ensuring high-quality secondary combustion; As a reactant in the (carburetted) water gas plant, as well as driving the equipment thereof, such as the numerous blowers used in that process, as well as the oil spray for the carburettor; For the operation of fire, water, liquid, liquor, and tar pumps; For the operation of engines driving coal and coke conveyor-belts; For clearing of chemical obstructions in pipes, including naphthalene & tar as well as general cleaning of equipment; For heating cold buildings in the works, for maintaining the temperature of process piping, and preventing freezing of the water of the gasholder, or congealment of various chemical tanks and wells.

Heat recovery appliances could also be classed with boilers. As the gas industry applied scientific and rational design principles to its equipment, the importance of thermal management and capture from processes became common. Even the small gasworks began to use heat-recovery generators, as a fair amount of steam could be generated for "free" simply by capturing process thermal waste using water-filled metal tubing inserted into a strategic flue.

===== Dynamos/generators =====
As the electric age came into being, the gas-works began to use electricity – generated on site – for many of the smaller plant functions previously performed by steam or gas-powered engines, which were impractical and inefficient for small, sub-horsepower uses without complex and failure-prone mechanical linkages. As the benefits of electric illumination became known, sometimes the progressive gasworks diversified into electric generation as well, as coke for steam-raising could be had on-site at low prices, and boilers were already in the works.

===== Coal storage =====
According to Meade, the gasworks of the early 20th century generally kept on hand several weeks of coal. This amount of coal could cause major problems, because coal was liable to spontaneous combustion when in large piles, especially if they were rained upon, due to the protective dust coating of the coal being washed off, exposing the full porous surface area of the coal of slightly to highly activated carbon below; in a heavy pile with poor heat transfer characteristics, the heat generated could lead to ignition. But storage in air-entrained confined spaces was not highly looked upon either, as residual heat removal would be difficult, and fighting a fire if it was started could result in the formation of highly toxic carbon monoxide through the water-gas reaction, caused by allowing water to pass over extremely hot carbon (H_{2}O + C = H_{2} + CO), which would be dangerous outside, but deadly in a confined space.

Coal storage was designed to alleviate this problem. Two methods of storage were generally used; underwater, or outdoor covered facilities. To the outdoor covered pile, sometimes cooling appurtenances were applied as well; for example, means to allow the circulation of air through the depths of the pile and the carrying off of heat. Amounts of storage varied, often due to local conditions. Works in areas with industrial strife often stored more coal. Other variables included national security; for instance, the gasworks of Tegel in Berlin had some 1 million tons of coal (6 months of supply) in gigantic underwater bunker facilities half a mile long (Meade 2e, p. 379).

===== Coal stoking and machine stoking =====
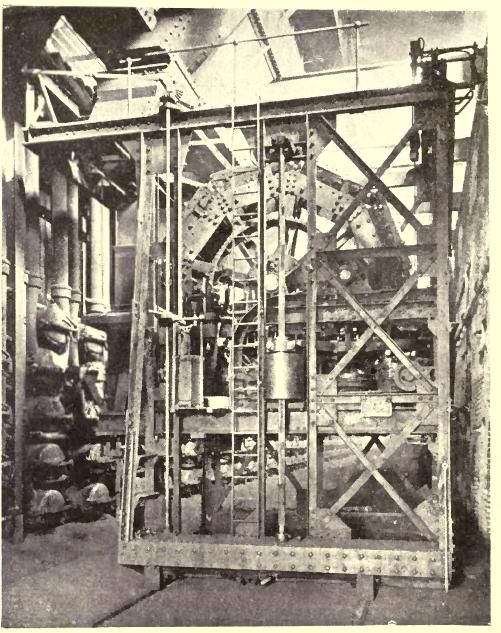
Horizontal retorts with a stoking machine

Machine stoking or power stoking was used to replace labor and minimize disruptions due to labor disputes. Each retort typically required two sets of three stokers. Two of the stokers were required to lift the point of the scoop into the retort, while the third would push it in and turn it over. Coal would be introduced from each side of the retort. The coke produced would be removed from both sides also. Gangs of stokers worked 12-hour shifts, although the labor was not continuous. The work was also seasonal, with extra help being required in the winter time. Machine stoking required more uniform placement of the retorts. Increasing cost of labor increased the profit margin in experimenting with and instituting machine stoking.

===== Tar/liquor storage =====
The chemical industries demanded coal tar, and the gas-works could provide it for them; and so the coal tar was stored on site in large underground tanks. As a rule, these were single wall metal tanks – that is, if they were not porous masonry. In those days, underground tar leaks were seen as merely a waste of tar; out of sight was truly out of mind; and such leaks were generally addressed only when the loss of revenue from leaking tar "wells", as these were sometimes called, exceeded the cost of repairing the leak.

Ammoniacal liquor was stored on site as well, in similar tanks. Sometimes the gasworks would have an ammonium sulfate plant, to convert the liquor into fertilizer, which was sold to farmers.

===== Station meter =====
This large-scale gas meter precisely measured gas as it issued from the works into the mains. It was of the utmost importance, as the gasworks balanced the account of issued gas versus the amount of paid for gas, and strived to detect why and how they varied from one another. Often it was coupled with a dynamic regulator to keep pressure constant, or even to modulate the pressure at specified times (a series of rapid pressure spikes was sometimes used with appropriately equipped street-lamps to automatically ignite or extinguish such remotely).

===== Anti-naphthalene minor carburettor =====
This device injected a fine mist of naphtha into the outgoing gas so as to avoid the crystallization of naphthalene in the mains, and their consequent blockage. Naphtha was found to be a rather effective solvent for these purposes, even in small concentrations. Where troubles with naphthalene developed, as it occasionally did even after the introduction of this minor carburettor, a team of workers was sent out to blow steam into the main and dissolve the blockage; still, prior to its introduction, naphthalene was a very major annoyance for the gasworks.

===== High-pressure distribution booster pump =====
This steam or gas engine powered device compressed the gas for injection into the high-pressure mains, which in the early 1900s began to be used to convey gas over greater distances to the individual low pressure mains, which served the end-users. This allowed the works to serve a larger area and achieve economies of scale.

== Types of historically manufactured fuel gases ==
"Town Gases" or "Utility Gases" that formed the backbone of the 19th-century lighting industry.

- Coal Gas (Retort Gas): The most widespread form; produced by the destructive distillation of bituminous coal in sealed retorts. It was the primary "City Gas" for streetlights.
  - Cannel Gas: A high-quality illuminating gas made specifically from Cannel Coal, which was rich in hydrogen and produced a much brighter flame than standard coal (Torbanite being the origin of Kerosene lamp oil in 1851 and soon after Cannel Coal).
- Wood Gas (Gas Sylvestre): One of the earliest forms (demonstrated by Philippe LeBon); produced by gasifying wood. It was less popular for city lighting due to lower brightness but common in timber-rich regions.
- Peat Gas: Produced similarly to coal gas but using dried peat; used primarily in regions lacking coal deposits (e.g., parts of Ireland and Germany).
- Lignite Gas: Produced from "Brown Coal" (Lignite); often used in central Europe.
- Carburetted Water Gas (CWG): A hybrid gas created by "carburetting" (enriching) Blue Water Gas with sprayed oil. This was the standard utility gas by the late 1800s because it matched the brightness of coal gas but was cheaper to produce.
  - Water Gas (Blue Water Gas / BWG): Produced by passing steam over incandescent coke. Note: In its "Blue" state, it was not an illuminating gas (it burned with a non-luminous flame) until enriched.

Specialized/Niche technical gases (such as "Oil Gas" or "Portable Gas" ) rather than the general utility "Manufactured Gas".

- Kerosene Gas: Produced by the thermal cracking of kerosene. Unlike coal gas on a municipal grid, Kerosene Gas was made onsite by facilities with constant fire (hot retort) "Gas Machines".
  - Oil-Shale Gas: A specific subset of oil gas derived from the destructive distillation of bituminous shale (notably "Torbanite"), producing a very high-candlepower light.
- Pintsch Gas: A high-pressure "Mineral Oil Gas" made from naphtha or shale oil. It was the global standard for railway carriage lighting and lighthouses because it remained stable and luminous even when highly compressed.
- Blau Gas: An evolution of Pintsch gas that was liquefied under pressure. It was famous for being the fuel/ballast for the Graf Zeppelin, as its density was nearly identical to air, and it provided a very steady, clean light.
- Acetylene Gas: Produced by reacting calcium carbide with water. In the late 1890s, it was a major competitor to coal gas for bicycle/automobile headlamps and rural home lighting because it produced the "whitest" and brightest flame of any gas.
- Carburetted Air Gas (Cold Gas): Often confused with manufactured gas, this was simply air passed through a tank of volatile Gasoline (Naphtha). It "picked up" the vapors to become a combustible gas without needing a heated retort.
- Rosin Gas: Produced from the distillation of pine resin; briefly popular in the mid-19th century in the Southern United States and parts of France where pine forests were abundant.

Gas Family	Primary Feedstock	Common Use
Coal/Town Gas	Bituminous Coal	Municipal Street Lighting
Oil Gas	Naphtha (water-like/spirituous mineral oil)	Trains, Buoys, Lighthouses
Kerosene Gas	Kerosene (thin/non-viscous mineral oil)	Facilities with onsite constant fire (hot retort) "Gas Machines"
Carbide Gas	Calcium Carbide	Portable Lamps (Bikes/Miners)

Timeline
Date/Period	Gas Type	Description and Notes
~1785 – 1794	Coal Gas (Early Distillation)	First demonstrated by Jan Pieter Minckeleers for lighting a lecture hall (1785) and developed on a small scale by William Murdoch in Britain (1790s). Produced by heating coal in an enclosed oven.
1799 – 1812	Wood Gas	Patented by Philippe LeBon in his "Thermolamp" system, made from the distillation of wood and coal. It was later used to light some European towns in the mid-19th century.
1812	Coal Gas (Town Gas/Retort Gas)	Became the primary fuel for the world's first gas utilities (e.g., the Gas Light and Coke Company, London). It was the dominant "Town Gas" for street and domestic lighting throughout most of the 19th century.
1840s	Blast Furnace Gas (BFG)	By-product of blast furnaces that is generated when the iron ore is reduced with coke to metallic iron. A lean version of syngas, it has a very low heating value.
Early 19th Century (Post-1840s)	Producer Gas / Coal Gasification	A low-calorific gas made by passing air over hot coke (a byproduct of coal gas production). Used primarily for heating industrial furnaces.
Second Half of 19th Century	Water Gas / Blue Water Gas (BWG)	A primitive Syngas made by passing steam over incandescent coke. It burned blue, had low luminosity, and was unsuitable for lighting until it was "carburetted."
1854	Onsite Kerosene Gas ("Oil gas")	Kerosene feedstock (called "Coal Oil" or "Illuminating Oil" in the 1800s). This feedstock was from the middle distillates of the refinery process of crude-oil derived from Torbanite and Cannel Coal.: Facilities with onsite constant fire (hot retort) "Gas Machines"—using Kerosene—to produce Illuminating Oil-Gas.; Operational hazards and technical complexities.; Cleaner than coal gas (which contained sulfur and ammonia) and produced a significantly brighter, whiter light (higher candlepower). But required mediation of kerosene gas being too rich in carbon, resulting in excess black soot (lampblack).
Late 19th Century	Oil Gas (Pintsch Gas, Blau Gas)	A high-calorific gas produced by super-heating oil (often naphtha or heavy oil) in the absence of air. Pintsch gas became the standard for lighting railway carriages and navigation buoys in the 1870s.
Late 19th Century (Post-1870s)	Carburetted Water Gas (CWG)	Water Gas (BWG) was enriched to make it luminous, creating a bright and popular alternative to the original pure Coal Gas.
Late 19th Century (Post-1880s)	Aerogen Gas / Air Gas	Produced by mixing air with vapors from volatile hydrocarbons (like gasoline, petroleum ether, or naphtha). Used for lighting country houses on a smaller scale.
~1898	Acetylene Gas	Produced from water reacting with calcium carbide. Used primarily for lighting (carbide lamps) and cooking on a small scale, but its volatility and the rise of electricity limited its widespread use.
1900s – 1930s	Natural Gas	Pipeline construction from fields like Texas and Oklahoma began to supplement, and eventually entirely replace, manufactured gases in North America and later Europe.
Modern Era	Substitute natural gas (SNG)	The modern term for gas produced via coal gasification, as energy utilities now evaluate it as a potentially cleaner way to generate power from coal.

1. Semi-Water Gas (Halbwassergas): A gas produced by the simultaneous introduction of air and steam.

- By blowing a mixture of air and steam through incandescent fuel. This balances the exothermic producer gas reaction with the endothermic water gas reaction to maintain a constant temperature in the generator without needing "blow" and "run" cycles.
- It is high in nitrogen (from the air) but has a higher calorific value than producer gas.

2. Double Gas (Doppelgas – Strache Process): A gas produced by the combination of Water Gas + Coal Gas (Distillation Gas). "Kohlenwassergas entsteht im Wassergasbetrieb als Gemisch von Wassergas mit Schwelgas. Sonderbezeichnung: Doppelgas. [A Hydrocarbon_rich gas is produced during a mixture operation of water gas and low-temperature carbonization gas (Schwelgas). Special designation: Doppelgas.]"

- Developed by Hugo Strache, this process uses a single vessel with two zones. The top zone carbonizes (distills) the coal using the heat of the water gas rising from the bottom zone.
- A gas with a calorific value of approximately 15–17 MJ/m³, effectively doubling the yield of gas per ton of coal compared to traditional retort carbonization, though it leaves no coke behind for sale (the coke is consumed in the water gas stage).

Gas Type	German Term	Principal Components	Primary Benefit
Semi-Water Gas	Halbwassergas	Water Gas + Producer Gas	Continuous operation (no cycles).
Double Gas	Doppelgas	Water Gas + Schwelgas=Schwelen@400–700 °C (Coal Gas)	High yield; total gasification of coal.
Triple Gas	Trigas	Water Gas + Schwelgas + Producer Gas	Maximizes thermal efficiency of low-grade coal.

- Triple Gas (Trigas Verfahren Dellwik-Fleischer): a triple blend of Water Gas, Distillation Gas (de:Schwelgas, see de:Schwelerei (Kohle)), and a small, controlled amount of Producer Gas.

Types of historically manufactured fuel gases
Manufactured gas	Feedstock	Manufacture	Composition	Heat yield at Standard Temperature and Pressure(STP) (BTU/ft^{3})	Light yield at STP (std candle/ft^{3})	Notes
Coal gas	Primarily bituminous or cannel coal. Lignite occasionally used.	Carbonization (pyrolysis) of the coal feedstock (the heating of the coal feedstock in the absence of oxygen.) The gas produced by the hot coal is the gas distributed.	As distributed, contains a moderate proportion of marsh gas (methane, CH_{4}), hydrogen (H_{2}), carbonic oxide (carbon monoxide, CO), and simple hydrocarbon "illuminants", including oliefant gas (ethylene, C_{2}H_{4}) and acetylene gas (C_{2}H_{2}). In addition, prior to treatment, contains coal tars (complex aliphatic and aromatic hydrocarbons), ammoniacal liquor (gaseous ammonia, NH_{3}, and aqueous ammonia, NH_{4}OH), the sulfuret of hydrogen (H_{2}S), and the sulfuret of carbon (CS_{2}).	500–650	10–18	The oldest type, introduced in 1798 by Murdoch, et al.; when the term "manufactured gas" or "town gas" is used without qualifiers, it generally refers to coal gas. Substantially greater illuminant yield with use of special "cannel coal", which may be modern oil shale, richer in hydrocarbons than most regular gas coal (bituminous coal).
Wood gas	Timber resources.	Carbonization (pyrolysis) of the timber feedstock (the heating of the timber feedstock in the absence of oxygen.) The volatiles evolved from the heated wood is the gas distributed.	Resulting products unknown. Probably marsh gas, hydrogen, and carbonic oxide, along with some hydrocarbons and organics, like turpentine.	?	< 10	Wood was used as a feedstock during the early days (1820s - 1850s) of manufactured gas in certain areas of the United States, due to lack of development of coal resources. Wood was carbonized in a manner similar to coal; however, the gas evolved was markedly inferior to that of coal in lighting and heating qualities. Still very useful for lighting. This wood gas produced solely through pyrolysis should not be confused with wood gas as used today; the modern wood gas generator produces its synthesis gas through the complete gasification process, as described below.
Oil pyrolytic gas.	Petroleum oil.	Carbonization (pyrolysis) of petroleum (the heating of the petroleum feedstock in the absence of oxygen.) The gas produced by the heated & decomposed oil is the gas distributed.	As distributed, contains an extremely high proportion of simple hydrocarbon "illuminants", including oliefant gas (ethylene, C_{2}H_{4}) and acetylene gas (C_{2}H_{2}), as well as propane gas (C_{3}H_{8}), marsh gas (methane, CH_{4}), hydrogen (H_{2}), and a small amount of carbonic oxide (carbon monoxide, CO).	1000–1500	40–60	Initial experiments in 1817–1825, which were failures; began to be used widely in 1860s. Simpler, much less labor-intensive manufacturing process. Oil very expensive feedstock compared to coal; prices (and illuminous efficacy per ft^{3}) double to triple that of regular coal gas.
Oil catalytic semi-water gas. (Improved Jones Process)	Petroleum oil.	Staged partial reaction of petroleum oil using steam at high temperature in catalytic environment. The gas produced by the partially reacted and partially cracked oil is the gas distributed.	As distributed, contains 35 – 40% hydrogen (H_{2}), 45% – 50% marsh gas (methane, CH_{4}), and the balance of higher hydrocarbons and carbonic oxide (carbon monoxide, CO).	500–700	10–18	E.C. Jones, chief gas engineer of the San Francisco Gas Light Company (later the PG&E) developed this ingenious process to turn oil into a gas very similar to that produced by the pyrolysis of coal using a catalytic backflush of already produced gas and steam to provide a hydrogen atmosphere to stimulate disassociation of the oil with the minimal production of lampblack. Singlehandedly revolutionized gasmaking on the Pacific Coast, as oil was plentiful compared to coal, and could be turned into a gas capable of drop-in replacement for coal gas, eliminating the need for coal to be shipped by water transport from Australia and the Far East to Pacific ports at high expense. The Improved Jones Process and evolutions of that process continued to be used on the Pacific Coast until the end of the manufactured gas age.
Producer gas	Anthracite coal, coke, bituminous coal dust and waste, lignite, or biomass.	Manufactured by the incomplete combustion of varying carboniferous feedstocks in an extremely hot (>= 1100 °C), limited-oxygen atmosphere aided by the injection of a small, stoichiometric flow of steam.	Contains a high proportion of nitrogen (N_{2}) and carbonic oxide (carbon monoxide, CO), limited amounts of hydrogen (H_{2}), and a very small quantity of swamp gas (methane, CH_{4}).	100–170	nil	Produced in early days of coal gasification; however, only became common after invention of Otto cycle internal combustion engine for which it was an ideal fuel, as well as small-sized, reliable gas producers, which allowed the easy generation of producer gas nearly anywhere a supply of anthracite or coke was available. Gas generally not distributed past the walls of the production site, but used on location, due to low energy content and that it was mostly composed of deadly carbonic oxide. Used for standard domestic gas needs within institutions large enough to justify a hired man for the upkeep of the producer; these institutions often included work-houses, alms-houses, reformatories, orphanages, houses of correction, lunatic asylums, lyceums, industrial schools, and penitentiaries. Bulk heating, electric generation, and engine-running uses; also for welding purposes, as it possesses a "reducing flame" and a high temperature. N.B. One variant of producer gas was Mond gas, known for both its consistent yield and that ammonia could be obtained as a byproduct. Slight modifications of producer necessary.
Water gas	Coke or anthracite coal and steam.	Manufactured by the reaction of extremely hot feedstock and steam in a superheated non-oxygen atmosphere.	Contains high proportions of carbonic oxide (carbon monoxide, CO) and hydrogen (H_{2}), and very low proportions of other gasses.	~ 300	nil	Manufacture known since late 1830s. However, not optimized for profitable generation until approximately 1865–70. Produced using an intermittent process; first, the exothermic "blow", where the feedstock was heated by blowing air through it, followed by an endothermic "run", where the air was cut off, and steam passed through the now superhot feedstock, leading to the decomposition of the steam and scavenging of carbon from the feedstock. Generally mixed with coal gas, valued for being able to be produced "just in time" with 1 hour's notice, unlike coal gas, which would require 4+ days to bring online from idle. Low labor and capital costs, however, high, inefficient use of anthracite/coke feedstock.
Carburetted water gas	Water gas and petroleum or coal tar.	Manufactured by passing just-produced, super-hot water gas through a superheated "carburettor" into which petroleum or coal tar oil is sprayed, accomplishing the "cracking" of the oil into the gas.	Contains high proportions of carbonic oxide (carbon monoxide, CO) and hydrogen (H_{2}), and moderate proportions of marsh gas (methane, CH_{4}) and mixed hydrocarbon illuminant gasses.	400–700	10–25	Introduced in 1876. Became a common process during the heady days of gas-lighting from the 1870s to the first decade of the 20th century, especially useful for mixing with coal gas. Process had similar positives and negatives as straight water gas, but also had illuminant value, as well as higher cost, due to oil/tar use. Variable illuminant yield, depending on amount/quality of oil spray. As gas steadily lost ground as an illuminant, extensive carburetting reduced to low values or carburetting omitted entirely, representing a return to water gas.
Complete gasification gas	Gas-evolving coal or other organics.	Manufactured by a complex, staged process where as coal travelled down the vertical axis of an upright, semi-cylindrical reaction chamber, it would be subject to different chemical reactions based on what was being fed into that area of the reaction chamber.	Mix of carbonic oxide (carbon monoxide, CO), marsh gas (methane, CH_{4}), hydrogen (H_{2}), a small quantity of simple hydrocarbon illuminants, along with small quantities of nitrogen and carbon dioxide.	330–400	> 8	Earliest processes from 1895, came into industrial-scale use by 1918 (Meade, p. 766–769). Numerous processes developed, many in Germany, Austria, and other Continental nations. Potential of retaining over 75% energy of feedstock in gas with heat recovery from raw gas (Meade, p. 762), as compared to ~55% feedstock energy retention of other gasification processes.

== The evolution of Carbonization (pyrolysis) ==
=== I. The Experimental Era (1780s – 1805) ===
- 1785: First Implementation: Jan Pieter Minckeleers gasifies coal to light his lecture hall at the University of Louvain, establishing the feasibility of using carbonized coal gas for illumination.
- 1792–1794: Individual Retorts: William Murdoch begins small-scale experiments in Cornwall, heating coal in small iron pressure vessels (retorts) to light his home.
- 1799: The Thermolamp: Philippe LeBon patents a distillation oven for wood and coal. While technically a failure in France, his "Thermolamp" design sparks intense interest in Germany and serves as a precursor to industrial gas benches.
- 1805: Industrial Application: Boulton & Watt install a large-scale carbonization apparatus at the Philips & Lee textile mill in Salford. This marks the transition from "lab experiments" to industrial-scale lighting.

=== II. The Birth of the Gas Utility (1812 – 1850s) ===
- 1812: The First Utility: The Gas Light and Coke Company (London) receives a royal charter. This establishes the business model of selling gas as a utility.
- Evolution of Retort Design:
  - Vertical to Horizontal: Early engineers move from vertical vessels (hard to unload) to Horizontal Tubular Retorts made of cast iron.
  - The "D" Shape: Engineers standardize the "D-shaped" cross-section for retorts to maximize the surface area of the coal bed for more even carbonization.
- The Hydraulic Main: Developed by Samuel Clegg, this water-seal device carried gas from the retorts towards the purification system while preventing gas from flowing back through a retort when it was opened for recharging.

=== III. The Industrial Revolution of Gasworks (1850s – 1890s) ===
- 1850s: Material Shift: Retorts transition from cast iron to Fire Clay. This allows for significantly higher temperatures, leading to faster and more "complete" carbonization.
- 1855–1870: Siemens' Revolution: The introduction of the Open Hearth Furnace and Indirect Firing transforms the retort bench.
  - Generative/Regenerative Benches: Instead of coal being heated directly by a fire, "furnace gases" (CO and Hydrogen) are ignited around the retorts using preheated "secondary air," increasing efficiency tenfold.
- 1880s: Inclined Retorts: Attempting to reduce manual labor, gasworks introduce retorts set on an incline. Coal is poured in the top and coke is emptied by gravity at the bottom, though clumping issues limit their success.
- 1885: The Welsbach Mantle: The invention of the incandescent gas mantle allows non-luminous gas (produced by high-heat carbonization) to provide brilliant light, saving the industry from the threat of early electric bulbs.

=== IV. The Peak and Transition (1890s – 1960s) ===
- Machine Stoking: Steam and compressed-air driven machines are introduced to "ram" coal into the retorts and "push" coke out, replacing the "gangs of men" previously required for the grueling labor of the retort house.
- Through Retorts: The adoption of retorts with doors at both ends allows for a continuous "pushing" process, significantly increasing the scale of municipal gas production.
- Vertical Retort Systems: Toward the mid-20th century, automated vertical retorts (like the Woodall-Duckham system) become the pinnacle of carbonization technology, allowing for continuous operation.
- 1966: The End of Manufacture: Gas production from coal carbonization ceases in North America, fully displaced by natural gas. Europe continues the process until the 1980s.

== See also ==
- Blau gas
- Pintsch gas
- Industrial gas
- Gas Light and Coke Company
- Substitute natural gas
