= Hospital de Emergencias Clemente Álvarez =

Hospital in Rosario, Argentina

Coordinates: 32°57′10″S 60°40′14″W

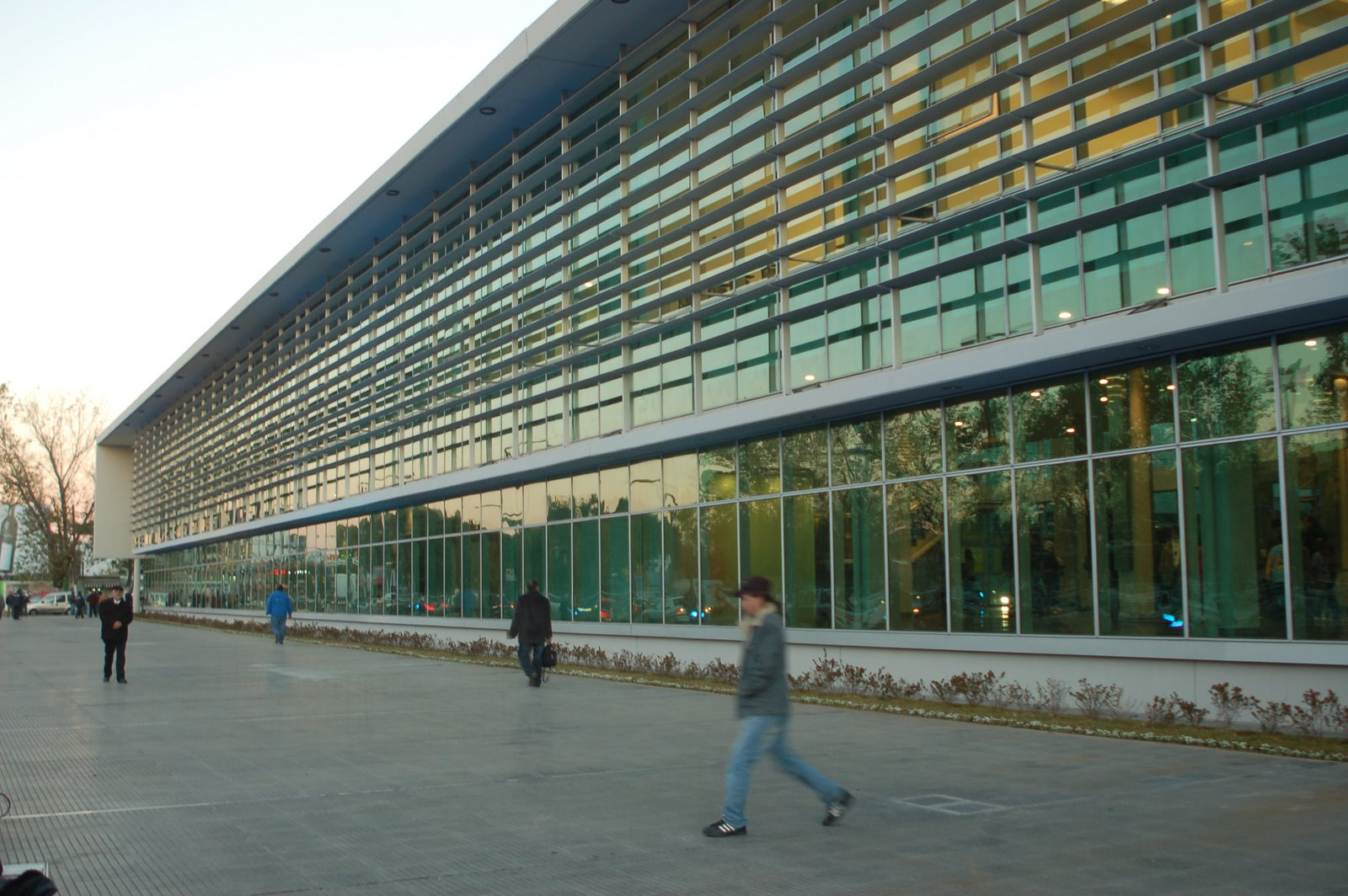
Clemente Álvarez Emergency Hospital

The Clemente Álvarez Emergency Hospital (Spanish: Hospital de Emergencias Clemente Álvarez, also abbreviated HECA) is an emergency hospital and trauma center in Rosario, province of Santa Fe, Argentina. It is located on the 3200 block of Pellegrini Avenue, west of the city center.

The hospital is the largest emergency center in Argentina, and its equipment ranks among the most modern in Latin America. Its burn unit is the only such one in the public sector in the city and the region. It employs more than 900 people.

The original HECA was located in the south of the city and was considerably smaller. The new facilities took 10 years to be completed, due in part to the 1998–2002 Argentine great depression between 1999 and 2002. The construction of the new HECA was finished on 30 May 2007, but the move, as well as the staff's re-training and testing, again delayed its inaugural until about a year later, on 5 May 2008.

== Features ==
- Area: 22,000 m^{2}
- 155 beds
- 6 surgery rooms
- Intensive care unit (24 beds)
- Coronary care unit
- Burn unit
- Medical imaging department:
  - Magnetic resonance imaging: open-bore MRI scanner
  - Computed tomography: multislice bihelical CT scanner
  - Radiology: 3 digital X-ray machines
  - Ultrasonography: 3 ultrasonography machines
  - Echocardiography
