= Texas Clean Energy Project =

World's first Integrated Gasification Combined Cycle (IGCC) clean-coal power plant

The Texas Clean Energy Project (TCEP) was a project developed by Summit Power Group, Inc intended to build of the world’s first Integrated Gasification Combined Cycle (IGCC) clean-coal power plant, a type of carbon capture and storage facility, located near Odessa, Texas (coordinates 31° 44' 46" N, 102° 35' 42" W).

== Background ==
According to Summit, the future Texas Clean Energy Plant was designed for 90% carbon capture, which was projected to be 2.7 million tons of carbon dioxide per year. If accomplished, this would be more than any other power plant of commercial scale operating anywhere in the world. As a result, the company declared that TCEP’s projected carbon emissions would be far lower than those of any existing fossil-fueled power plant.

The potential carbon captured by the plant would be used for enhanced oil recovery in the West Texas Permian Basin.

Summit was selected by the U.S. Department of Energy (DOE) to receive a $350 million cost-sharing award to assist in developing the plant. It was the largest award given up to that date by the DOE's Clean Coal Power Initiative (CCPI). One investor in the project is CW NextGen, Inc., a Clayton Williams company.

Funding for the project was cancelled in February 2016 for reasons explained in a DOE Inspector General report.

== History ==
In 2007, Odessa had been considered one of four candidate sites for a FutureGen Industrial Alliance project, “a public-private partnership to design, build, and operate the world's first coal-fueled, near-zero emissions power plant”. According to the FutureGen website, the DOE issued its Final Environmental Impact Statement (EIS) in November 2007, concluding that the Odessa site was acceptable from an environmental impact standpoint and could move forward in the site evaluation process. FutureGen ultimately selected another site, Mattoon, Illinois, as the final site.

After the decision was made, DOE representatives performed another similar site study at Odessa to determine if the site could qualify for funds from the Clean Coal Power Initiative. The Texas Clean Energy Project was later awarded $350 million from CCPI. Summit then announced plans in April 2008 to construct TCEP, a 600 megawatt IGCC coal-fired power plant in West Texas, located in the Permian Basin. This area was considered to be an ideal geographic location due to the local oil and gas companies using enhanced oil recovery via carbon dioxide flooding.

On June 22, 2009, a new Texas law, HB 469, was passed and signed by the governor. HB 469 offers significant financial incentives to the first three clean-coal power plants built in Texas that capture at least 50 percent of their carbon dioxide.

Summit formally launched a front-end engineering design (FEED) study on June 30, 2010, and later awarded the FEED contract to Siemens Energy to be the primary equipment provider. Other participants in the FEED study include Fluor Corporation (the design engineer) and Selas Fluid Processing Corporation, a Linde Group subsidiary. Construction is currently scheduled to begin on the project in the second half of 2011 upon completion of the FEED study.

TCEP was scheduled to achieve financial closing and commence construction in December 2010, but was delayed. The project seemed ready in 2012 at an estimated cost of $2.2 billion, but the Chinese company Sinopec signed on and requested a new FEED study. Cost estimates went to $3.5 billion due to increased labor costs. The labor market was tight due to an oil boom in the Permian Basin. Summit Power Group had not released the new FEED study results as of February 2015 and the future of the projects is in doubt.

== Leadership ==
Former Dallas mayor Laura Miller served as Director of Projects, Texas, while former Secretary of Energy Don Hodel served as Chairman and Senior Vice President for Strategy and Policy at Summit Power Group, Inc.
