= Blue billy =

Prussian blue deposit formed in soils contaminated by effluents of chemical industry

Blue billy is a chemical or mineral (Note: Strictly blue billy is not a mineral as it was not formed naturally.) deposit often encountered in contaminated land.

The name is a reference to its distinctive bright blue colour, which can make it immediately obvious in other mud or soil. Chemically it is a form of Prussian blue. Although several chemical industry processes could produce it, it is particularly associated with coal gasification and older town gasworks. It has been recognised as a problem effluent and land contaminant since the early industrial period and the first gasworks at the start of the 19th century.

As a visible proof of contamination, (Note: Although its absence is no proof of cleanliness) blue billy is an important signifier in contaminated land remediation projects and its discovery, especially if undisclosed, may be a cause of contract disputes.

== Causes ==
As one of a range of ferric ferrocyanides, blue billy is a compound of iron, carbon and nitrogen. Processes producing ammonia or cyanides in the presence of iron may give rise to it.

Most commonly it is found around old gasworks. Part of the gas production process, producing town gas by the gasification of coal, involves a liquid bubbler scrubber to remove ammonia compounds, including ammonium cyanide compounds, from the raw gas. If left untreated, these could cause corrosion in gas pipework. A further process to make the gas less toxic by removing hydrogen sulphide and hydrogen cyanide, the purifier, passed the gas over trays of ferric oxide as bog iron ore, similar to red rust, which removed sulfur and cyanide compounds and became 'spent' in this process. These could be arranged as either a wet or dry process, where the gas produced was bubbled through water or passed through a box of a dampened absorber material such as wood shavings. These cheap materials were consumed and discarded periodically. Waste tips where they were dumped, or even storage areas where they remained for a time and released leachates, are all common places to find billy deposits forming.

Early gasworks, from 1812, used Samuel Clegg's 'wet lime' purification process which produced large quantities of blue billy. A later 'dry lime' process was developed, using moist hydrated lime, in part to avoid the problem of disposing of the blue billy waste. This process produced a waste known as 'foul lime'. Later the bog iron process supplemented the dry lime. Although the overall compositions of both spent oxide and foul lime are similar, with 6% cyanides and 36-60% free sulfur, the foul lime is far easier to dispose of. It is broken down by being left in open piles and allowed to weather, leaving a lime-rich residue which could be sold and used as a fertiliser. Bog iron wastes were also weathered in open piles, which allowed them to be regenerated for use four or five times, until they reached a final sulfur content of 50–60%. This ferrous sulphate was commercially saleable for acid production, and although the economics of this were only marginally profitable, it avoided disposal costs.

Coke works, where a similar process is carried out primarily to manufacture coke, either for steelmaking or as a smokeless fuel, are also common sites for its occurrence. Coke plants were noted for their iron wastes being more prone to contain ferrocyanides, not merely sulphates. If sufficiently concentrated, >5%, these would be commercially saleable.

If wastes are preserved in anoxic environments, the Prussian blue colour may not yet have developed. Exposing these to the air and allowing them to become oxidised lets the colour develop. When looking for blue billy as a way to indicate the extent of contamination, this time should be allowed for.

== Commercial uses ==
There have been very few commercial uses for blue billy, either as a by-product of production or as a means of disposal when unintended deposits are discovered.

It has been offered for sale as an ingredient in sulfuric acid production, although with little commercial acceptance.

In the past, blue billy has been sold as a weedkiller.

== Cleanup ==
Cleanup for urban gasworks, usually smaller Victorian sites, has usually consisted of removing the worst material en masse to a landfill site away from town.

Remediation of larger sites, such as industrial cokeworks, has required a more selective approach as the volumes and site values involved have been too large to justify simply carrying it away elsewhere. Bio-remediation, mechanically working the soil to expose it to air, sunlight and bacterial action, is a process which can be effective against tars, but not blue billy. Billy residues may require small-scale identification across the site and their separation. By such screening it has been possible to separate the worst of the wastes as one-thirtieth of the total, (Note: 2,000m^{3} from 65,000m^{3}, with a resultant 5,000m^{3} as stabilised.) then to stabilise that within a cementitious matrix and produce a stable form which could be re-used on site.

== See also ==
- Galligu, a contaminant from the Leblanc process of the early sodium carbonate industry
- Yellow boy, a yellow precipitate when iron(III) hydroxide is soluble in acidic runoff, but is then neutralised
