= Hydrogen Energy California =

Alternate energy and hydrogen power project

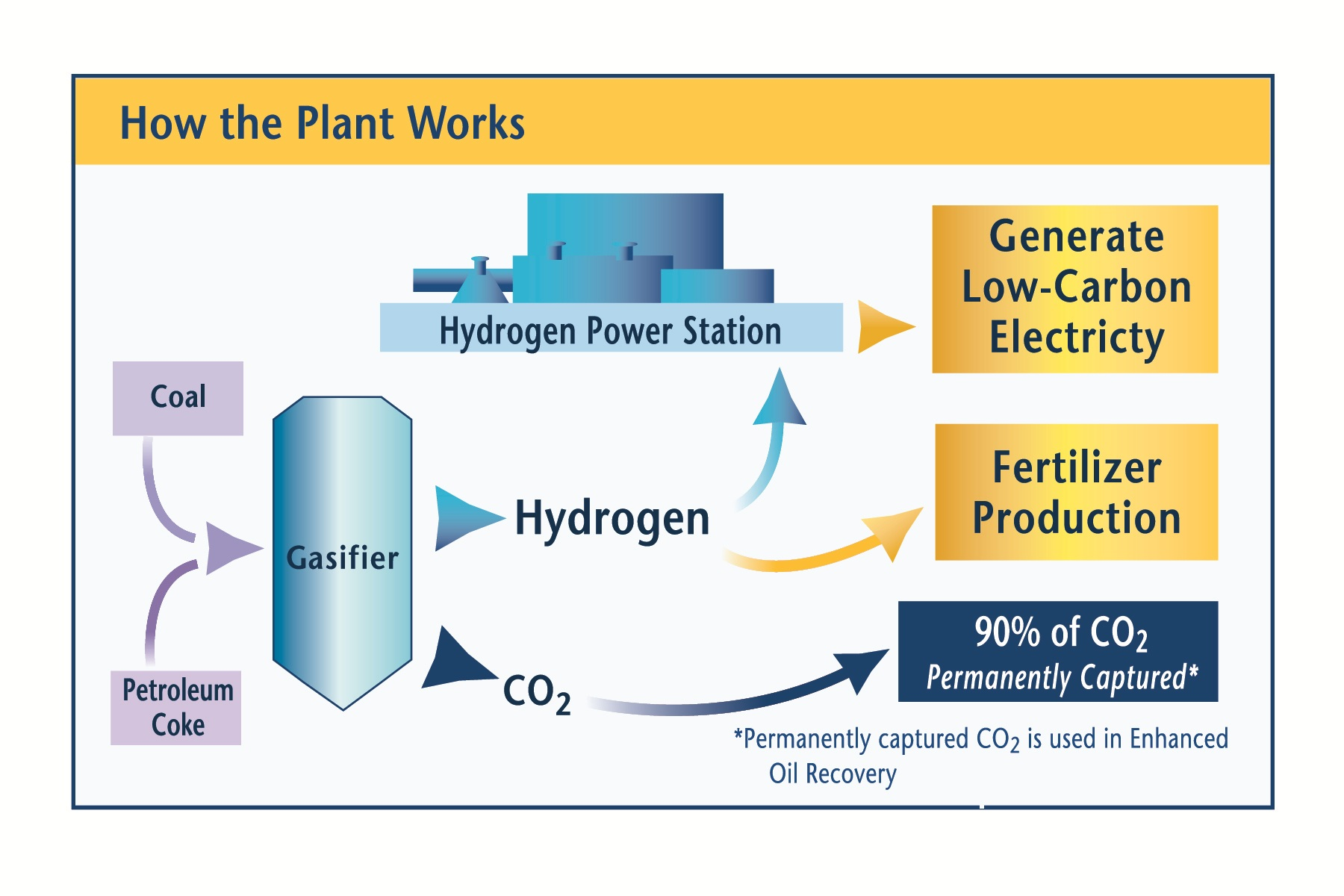
Hydrogen Energy California Facility Process

Hydrogen Energy California (HECA) was a proposed alternative energy hydrogen power project developing with support from the U.S. Department of Energy in Kern County, California which was not approved for construction.

The facility would have converted coal and refinery waste into an impure hydrogen fuel to be used to generate electricity and fertilizer. If it had become fully operational, it would have generated nearly 300MW of clean electricity and produced one million tons of locally manufactured, low-carbon fertilizer. However, significant drawbacks and cost overruns eliminated support for the proposal.

The facility was to be located on 542-acre (219 ha) of prime farmland in western Kern County, about 7 miles (11 km) west of Bakersfield and 1.5 miles (2.4 km) northwest of the unincorporated community of Tupman. The site was near the Elk Hills Oil Field where the captured CO_{2} was to be used for enhanced oil recovery by Occidental of Elk Hills, Inc. It was expected to have employed an 2,000 union workers in temporary construction jobs and would have created approximately 200 permanent jobs.

It was a project of SCS Energy LLC, an independent developer of clean power, was cofunded by the U.S. Department of Energy’s Office of Fossil Energy, and administered by the National Energy Technology Laboratory. The project was awarded a $408 million grant by the U.S. Department of Energy under Clean Coal Power Initiative Round 3.

== Process ==
The HECA project would have been an Integrated Gasification Combined Cycle (IGCC) facility using Mitsubishi's oxygen–blown gasifier technology which generates power extremely efficiently with minimal emissions. IGGC facilities differ from conventional fossil fueled power generation plants in that fossil fuels do not combust. Instead, a blend of recycled petroleum coke and coal are converted through gasification to manufacture hydrogen fuel.

A Rectisol acid gas removal system was to have separated and captured more than ninety percent of the carbon dioxide (CO_{2}) produced during the hydrogen manufacturing process. Most of the captured CO_{2} would then have been used for enhanced oil recovery at the nearby Elk Hills Oil Field. Some of the CO_{2} would have been used to manufacture fertilizer. Brackish groundwater would have served its process water needs in a Zero Liquid Discharge (ZLD) system in order to protect and conserve local freshwater sources.

== Drawbacks ==
However, most of the clean electricity produced by HECA would have been consumed by the plant's own processes at the same time it would have produced over 500 tons of criteria air pollutants in an area that already has the worst air pollution in the United States.

== Schedule ==
The project progressed through the regulatory approval process with the expectation that it would be completed and operational by 2017. On March 4, 2016, the California Energy Commission ordered the HECA application to be terminated for lack of progress.
